= Cadillac Eldorado =

American personal luxury car

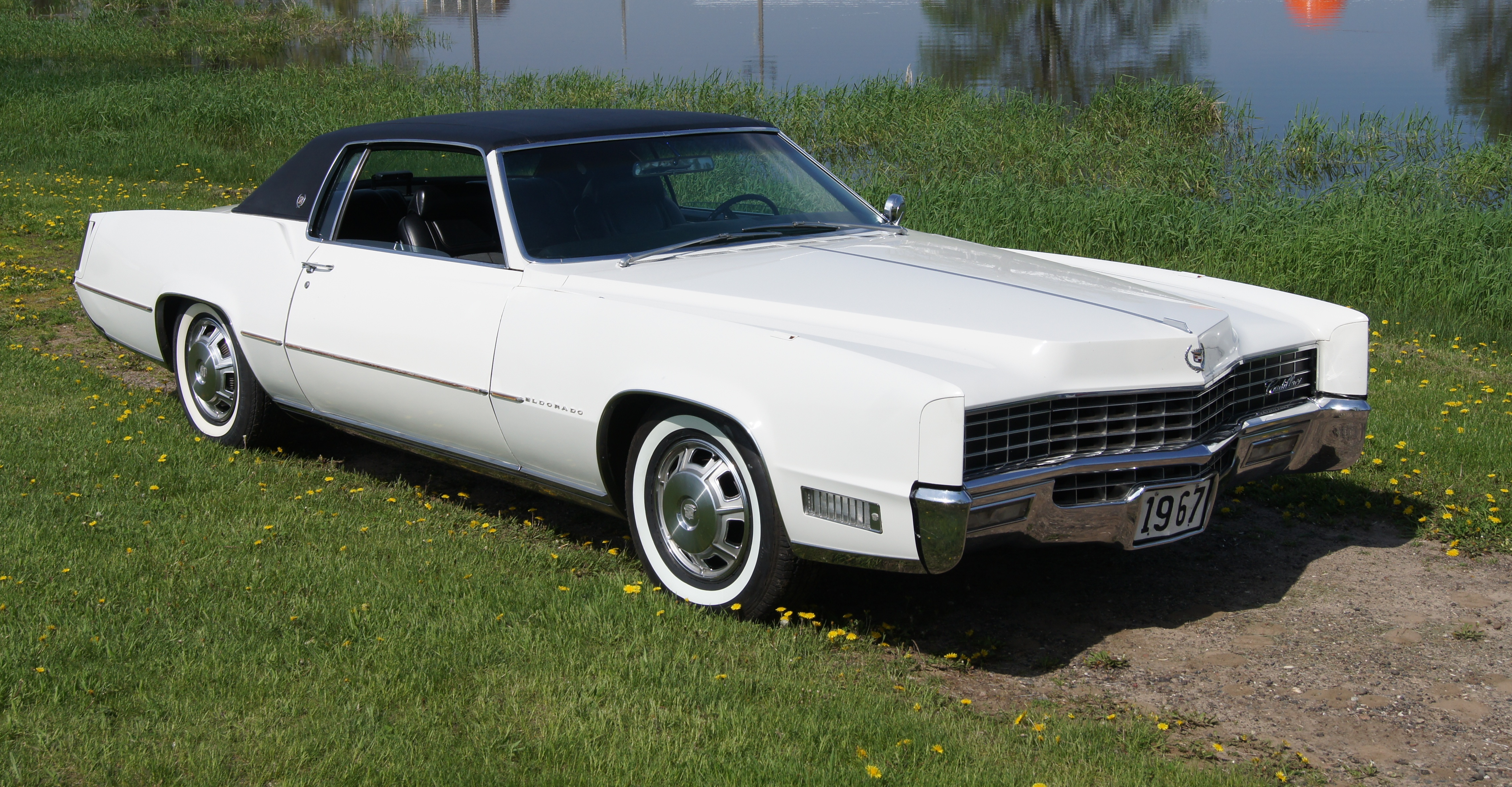
- 1967 Eldorado

Overview
- Manufacturer: Cadillac
- Also called: Cadillac Fleetwood Eldorado
- Production: 1952–2002

Body and chassis
- Class: Personal luxury car
- Layout: Front-engine, rear-wheel-drive (1953–1966); Front-engine, front-wheel-drive (1967–2002)

Chronology
- Successor: Cadillac CTS coupe

The Cadillac Eldorado is a luxury car manufactured and marketed by the Cadillac Motor Car Division of General Motors from 1952 until 2002, over twelve generations.

The Eldorado was at or near the top of the Cadillac product line. The original 1953 Eldorado convertible and the Eldorado Brougham models of 1957–1960 had distinct bodyshells and were the most expensive models offered by Cadillac during those years. The Eldorado was never less than second in price after the Cadillac Series 75 limousine until 1966. Beginning in 1967, the Eldorado retained its premium position in the Cadillac price structure, but was manufactured in high volumes on a unique, two-door personal luxury car platform.

The Eldorado carried the Fleetwood designation from 1965 through 1972, and was seen as a modern revival of the pre-war Cadillac V-12 and Cadillac V-16 roadsters and convertibles.

== Name ==
The nameplate Eldorado is a contraction of two Spanish words that translate as "the gilded (i.e., golden) one"—and also refers to El Dorado, the mythical Colombian "Lost City of Gold" that fascinated Spanish explorers. Chosen in an internal competition for a 1952 concept vehicle celebrating Cadillac's golden anniversary, the name Eldorado was subsequently adopted for a limited edition convertible for model year 1953.

Cadillac began using the nameplates "Eldorado Seville", after the city in southern Spain, and "Eldorado Biarritz" after the luxury seaside resort in southern France, to distinguish between the hardtop and convertible models (respectively) while both were offered, from 1956 through 1960 inclusively. The "Seville" name was dropped when the hardtop was initially discontinued (1961), but the Biarritz name continued through 1964. Beginning in 1965, the Eldorado became the Fleetwood Eldorado. "Biarritz" returned as an up level trim package for the Eldorado for 1976 until 1991.

== First generation (1953) ==
First generation
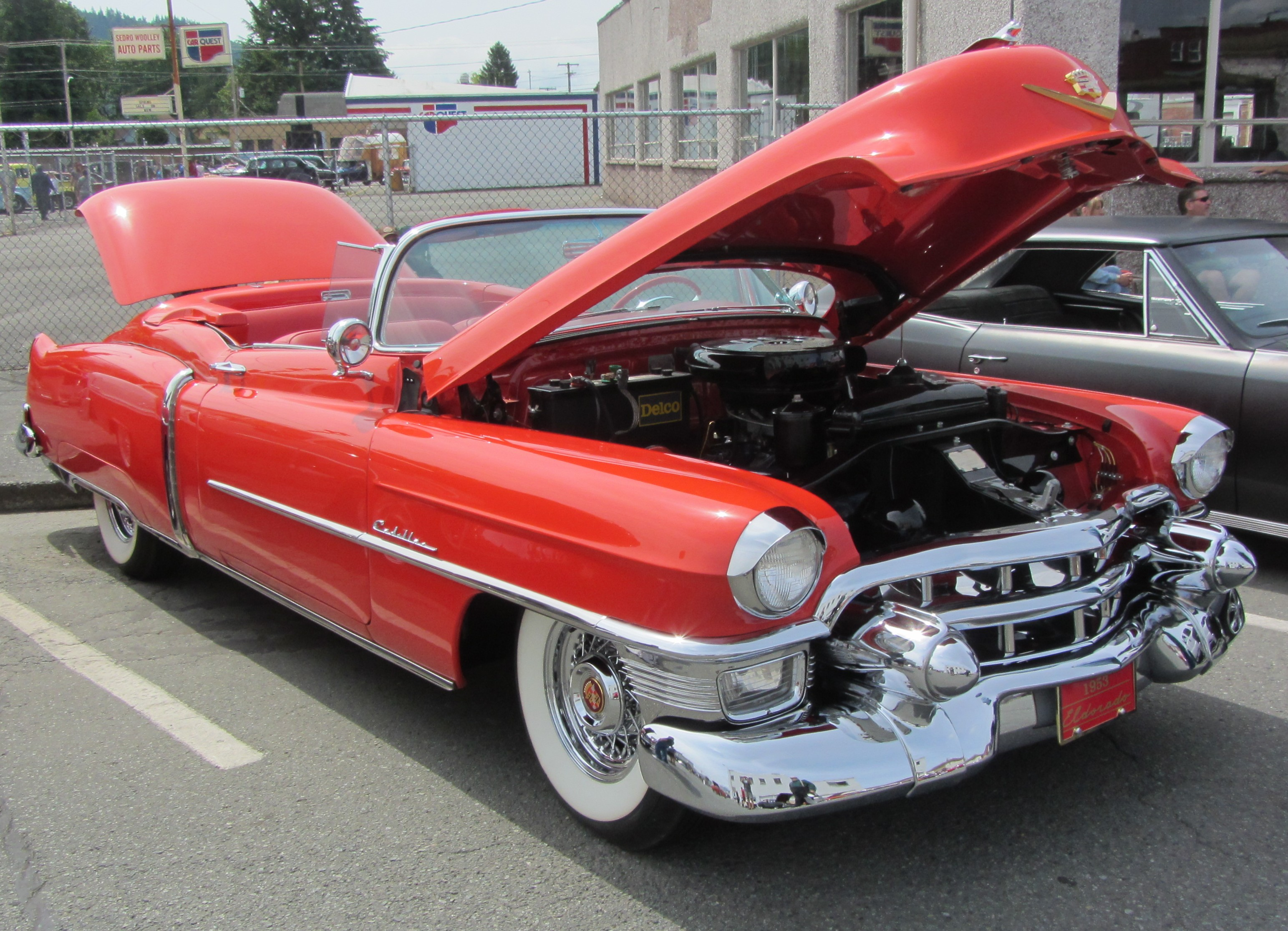
- 1953 Cadillac Eldorado

Overview
- Model years: 1953
- Assembly: Detroit, Michigan, U.S.
- Designer: Harley Earl

Body and chassis
- Body style: 2-door convertible
- Layout: FR layout
- Platform: C-body
- Related: Buick Roadmaster Skylark; Oldsmobile 98 Fiesta

Powertrain
- Engine: 331 cu in (5.4 L) Cadillac OHV V8
- Transmission: 4-speed Hydra-Matic

Dimensions
- Wheelbase: 126.0 in (3,200 mm)
- Length: 220.8 in (5,608 mm)
- Width: 80.1 in (2,035 mm)
- Height: 58.5 in (1,486 mm)
- Curb weight: 5,000 lb (2,300 kg)

The Cadillac Series 62 Eldorado joined the Oldsmobile 98 Fiesta and Buick Roadmaster Skylark as top-of-the-line, limited-production specialty convertibles introduced in 1953 by General Motors to promote its design leadership. A special-bodied, low-production convertible (532 units in total), it was the production version of the 1952 El Dorado "Golden Anniversary" concept car. Along with borrowing bumper bullets from the 1951 GM Le Sabre show car, it featured a full assortment of deluxe accessories and introduced the wraparound windshield and a cut-down beltline from Cadillac's standard production models.

The expansive frontal glass and distinctive dip in the sheet metal at the bottom of the side windows (featured on one or both of GM's other 1953 specialty convertibles) were especially beloved by GM styling chief Harley Earl and subsequently widely copied by other marques. It was available in four unique colors: Aztec Red, Alpine White, Azure Blue and Artisan Ochre. Convertible tops were available in either black or white Orlon. AC was an option at US$620 ($7,461 in 2025 dollars), as were wire wheels for US$325 ($3,911 in 2025 dollars). The car carried no special badging other than a gold-colored "Eldorado" nameplate in the center of the dash. A hard tonneau cover, flush with the rear deck, hid the convertible top when stored.

Although technically a subseries of the Cadillac Series 62 based on the regular Series 62 convertible and sharing its engine, it was nearly twice as expensive at US$7,750 ($93,260 in 2025 dollars) as the Packard Caribbean convertible.

The 220.8 inches (5,610 mm) long, 80.1 inches (2,030 mm) wide vehicle came with such standard features as windshield washers, a signal seeking radio, power windows, and a heater. Only 532 were produced, comprising just 0.5% of Cadillac's 1953 sales.

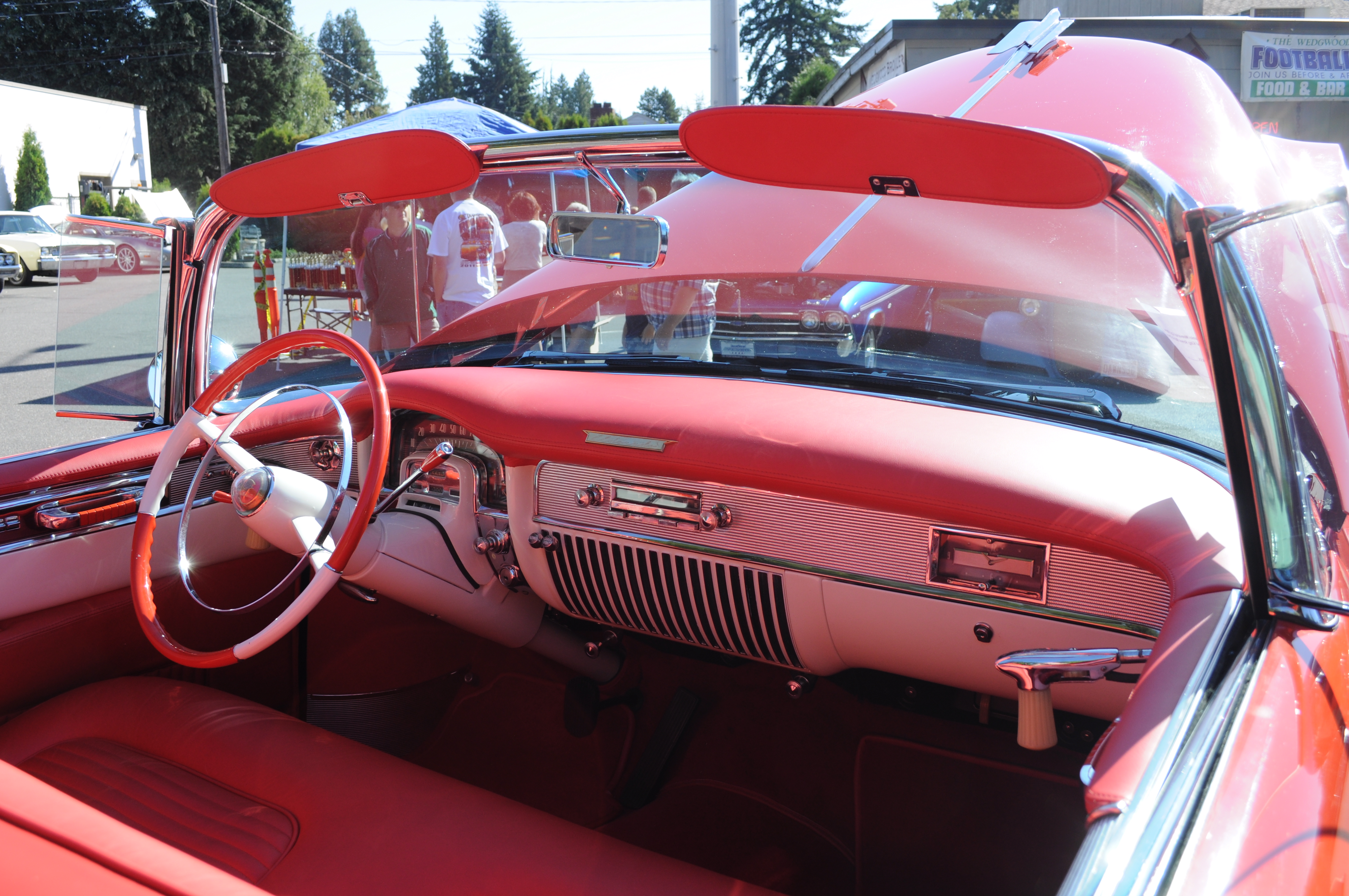
1953 Cadillac Eldorado interior

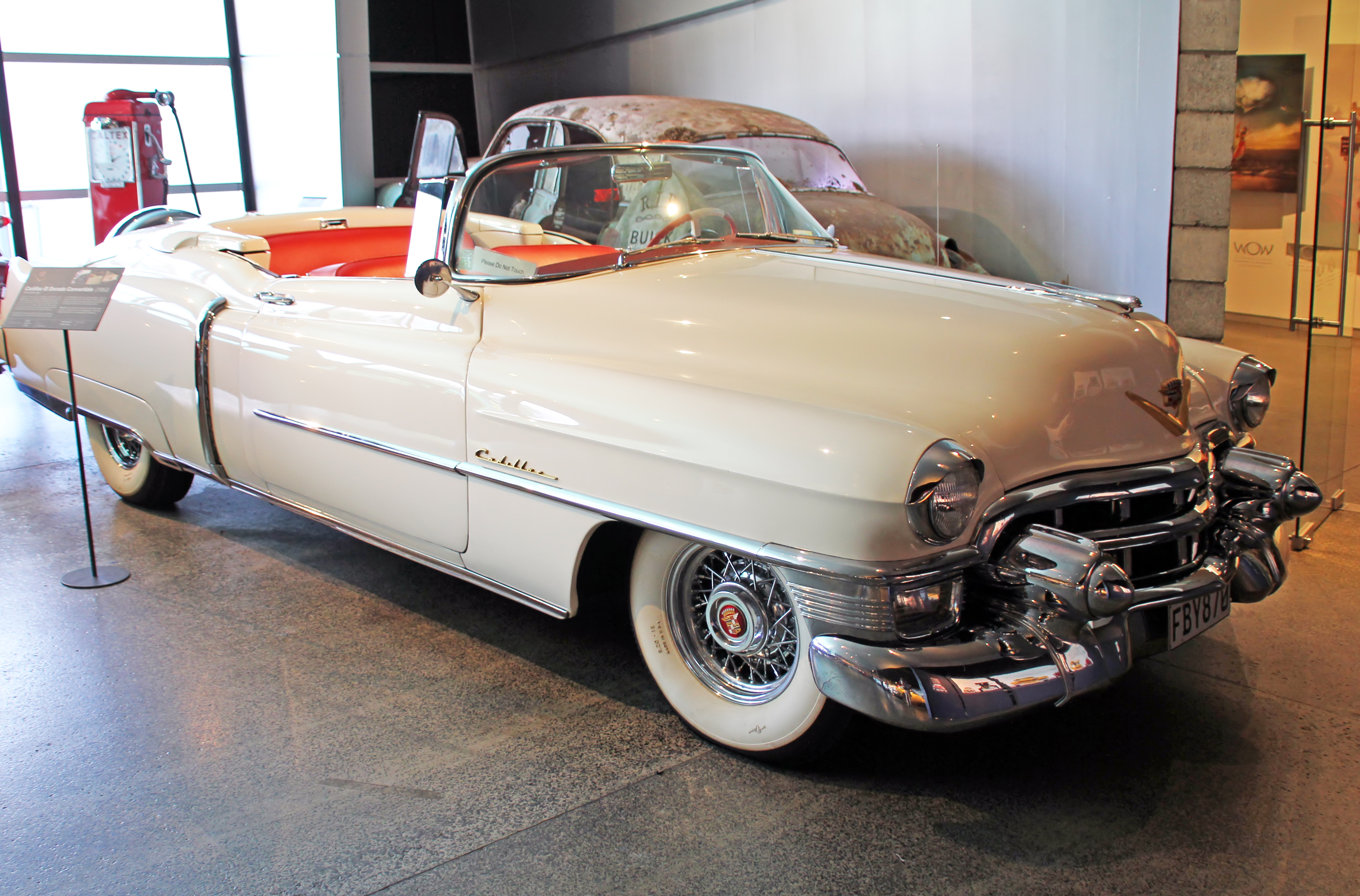
1953 Cadillac Eldorado

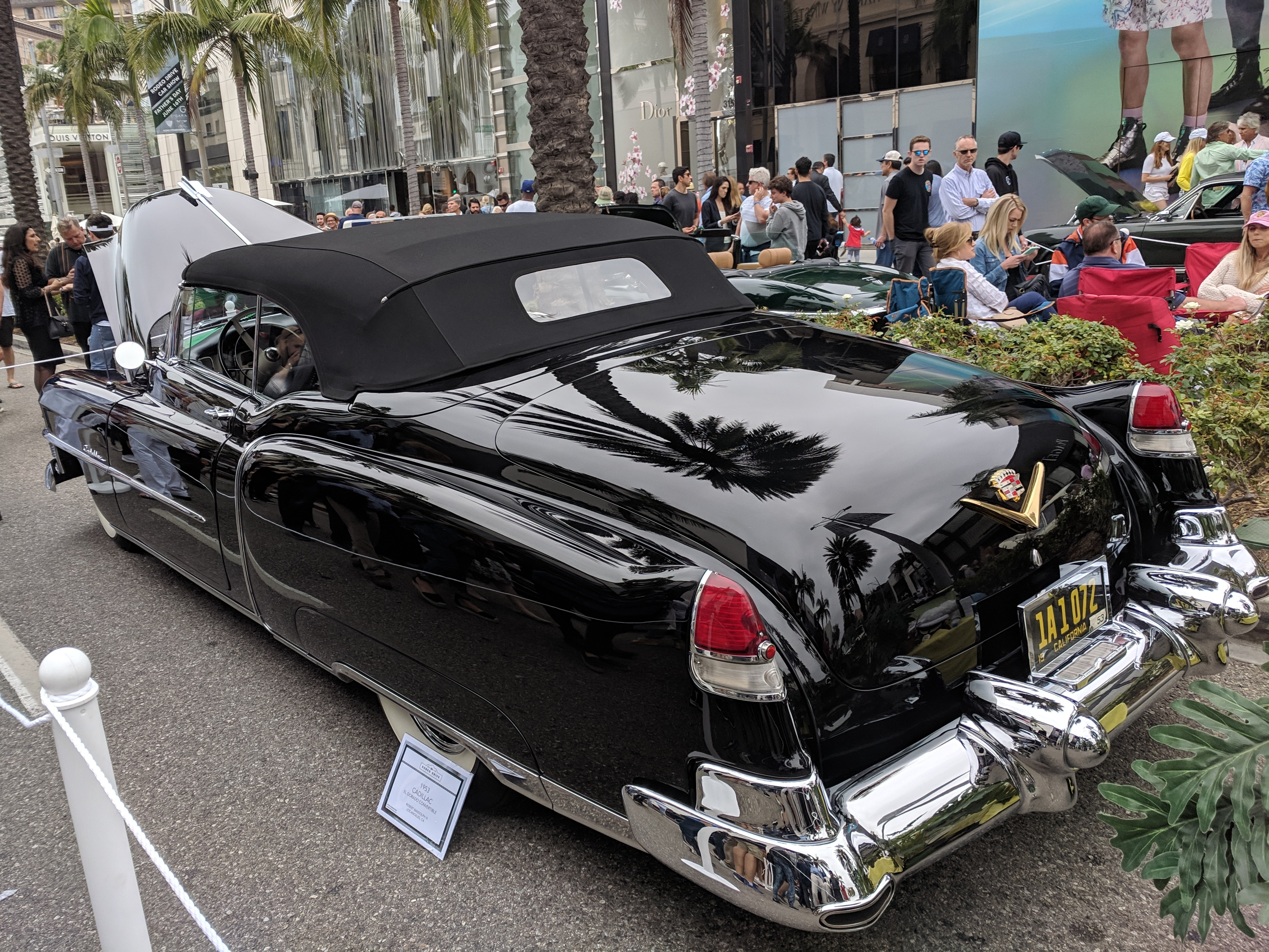
1953 Cadillac Eldorado (rear)

== Second generation (1954–1956) ==
Second generation
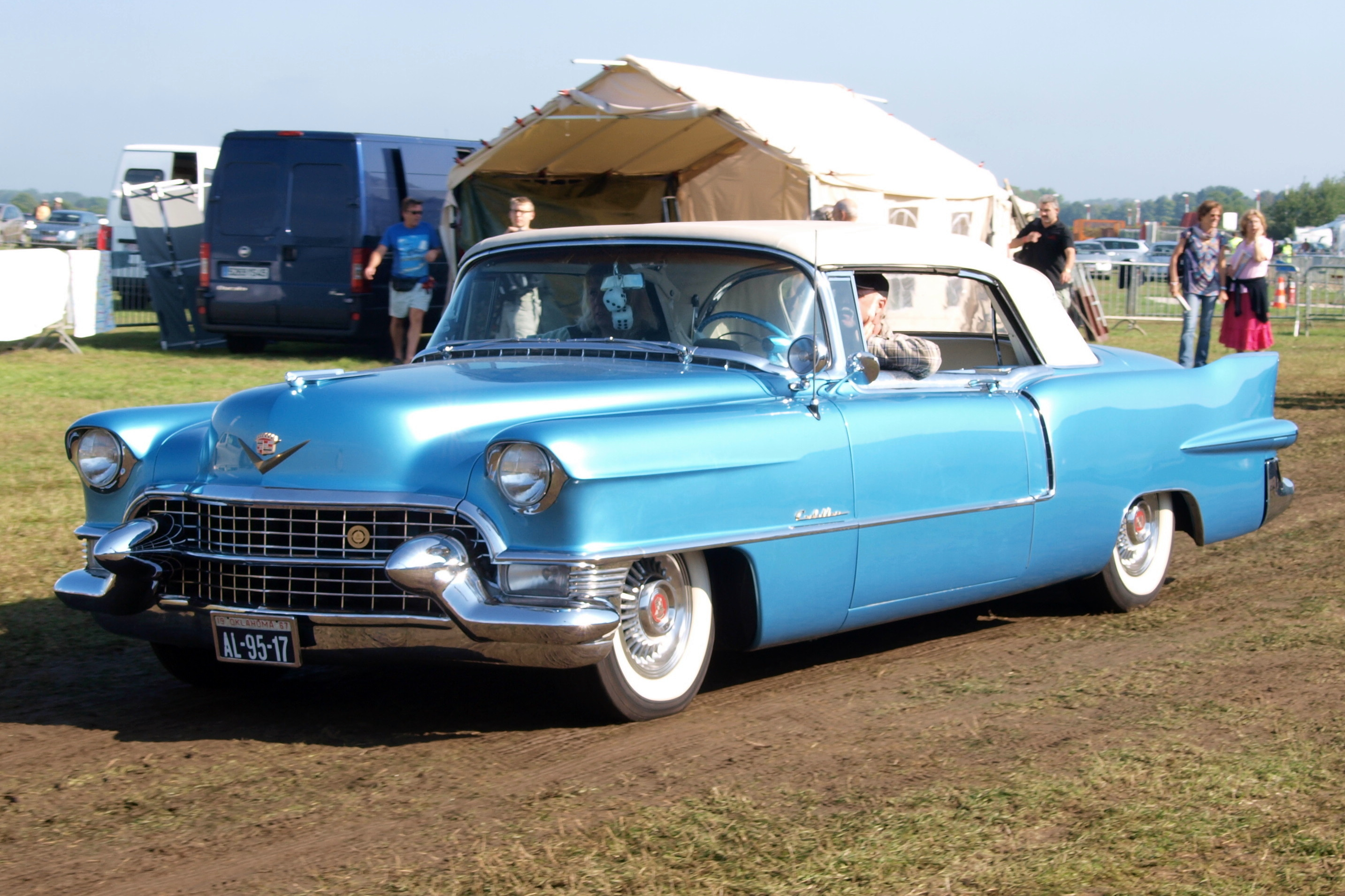
- 1955 Cadillac Eldorado

Overview
- Model years: 1954–1956
- Assembly: Detroit, Michigan, U.S.
- Designer: Harley Earl

Body and chassis
- Body style: 2-door hardtop 2-door convertible
- Layout: FR layout
- Platform: C-body
- Related: Buick Roadmaster; Oldsmobile Starfire 98

Powertrain
- Engine: 331 cu in (5.4 L) OHV V8; 365 cu in (6.0 L) OHV V8
- Transmission: 4-speed Hydra-Matic

Dimensions
- Wheelbase: 129.0 in (3,277 mm)
- Length: 1954: 223.4 in (5,674 mm); 1955: 223.2 in (5,669 mm); 1956: 222.2 in (5,644 mm)
- Width: 1954: 79.6 in (2,022 mm); 1955: 79.8 in (2,027 mm); 1956: 80.1 in (2,035 mm)
- Curb weight: 4,900–5,100 lb (2,200–2,300 kg)

In 1954, the Eldorado lost its unique sheetmetal in an effort by GM to lower its price in order to increase sales. Now sharing its basic body shell with standard Cadillacs, it was distinguished mainly by trim pieces, including golden identifying crests centered directly behind the air-slot fender breaks, and wide fluted beauty panels to decorate the lower rear sides. These panels were made of extruded aluminum, and also appeared on a one of a kind Eldorado coupé built for the Reynolds Aluminum Corporation. Also included in the production Eldorado convertible were monogram plates on the doors, wire wheels, and custom interior trimmings with the Cadillac crest embossed on the seat bolsters. Sales nearly quadrupled at a much more modest US$5,738 base price (equivalent to $68,792 in 2025 dollars), with a total of 2,150 Eldorados sold.

For 1955, the Eldorado's body gained its own rear end styling with somewhat higher, more slender, and distinctly pointed tailfins, a styling change that portended extreme exaggerations to come. The Eldorado sport convertible featured extras such as wide chrome body belt moldings and twin round taillights halfway up the fenders. Sales nearly doubled to 3,950.

For 1956, a two-door hardtop coupé version was released, called the "Eldorado Seville", and a two-door convertible called the "Eldorado Biarritz". An Eldorado script appeared with fender crest on the car, which was further distinguished by twin hood ornaments. An extra feature on the Eldorado convertible was a ribbed chrome saddle molding extending from the windshield to the rear window pillar along the beltline. With the addition of the Seville, sales rose yet again, by 60%. Of the 6,050 sold, 2,150 were Sevilles. Still the division's halo car, Eldorados accounted for just 4% of all Cadillacs sold.

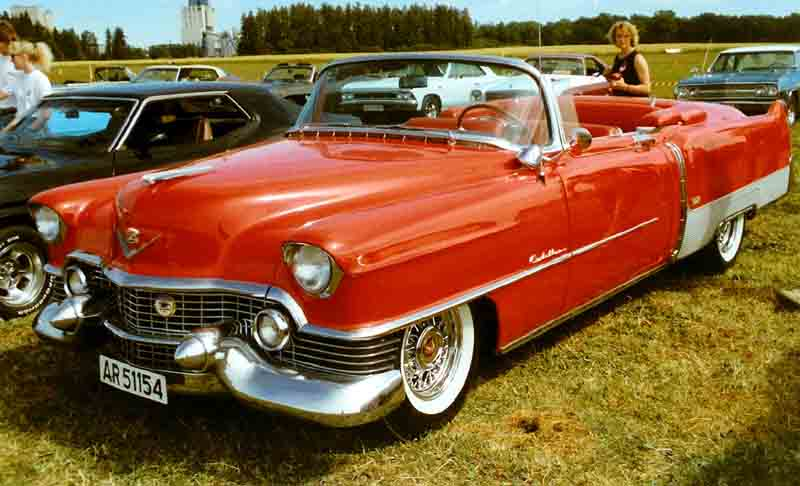
1954 Cadillac Eldorado

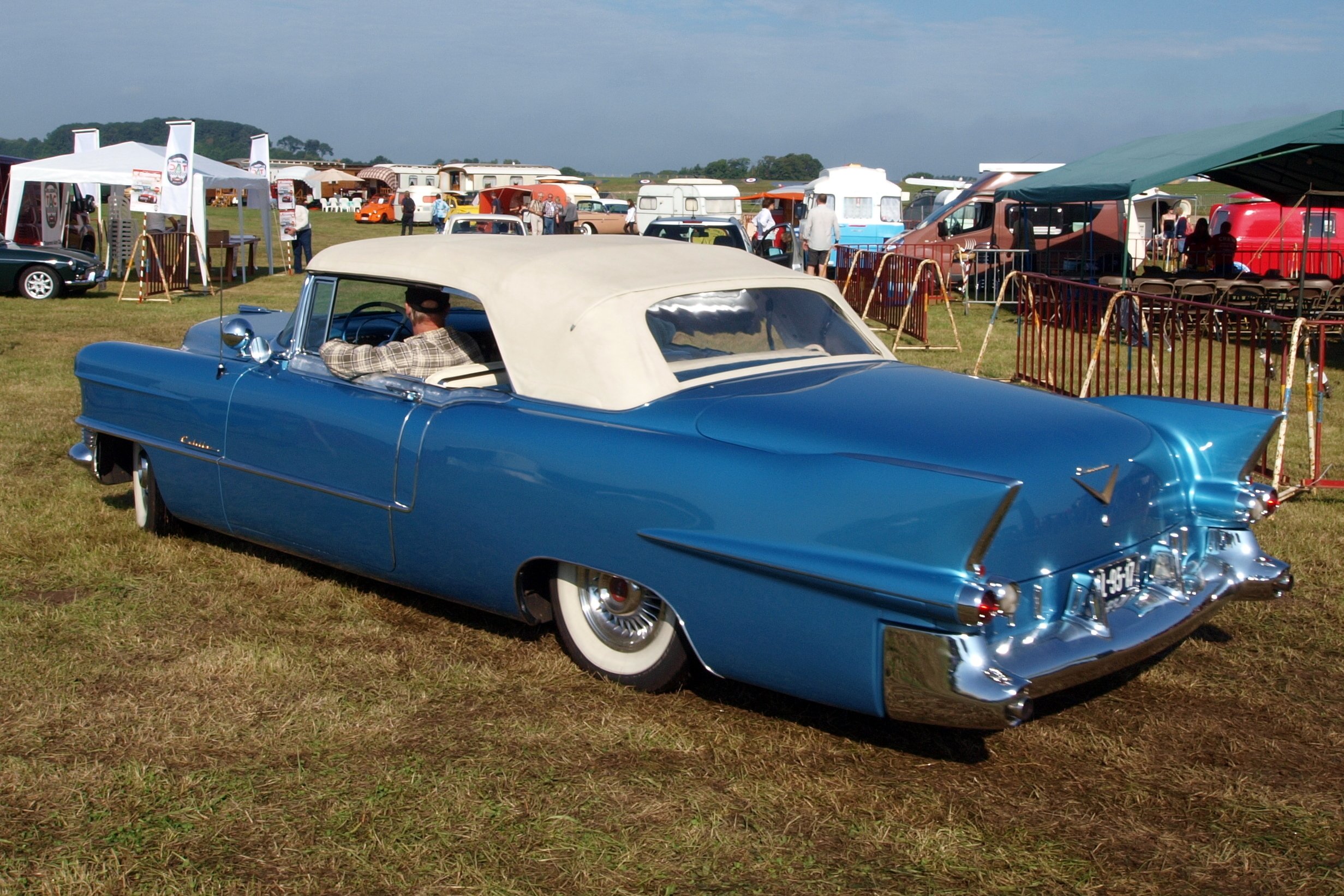
1955 Cadillac Eldorado with view of sharp "sharkfin" tailfins

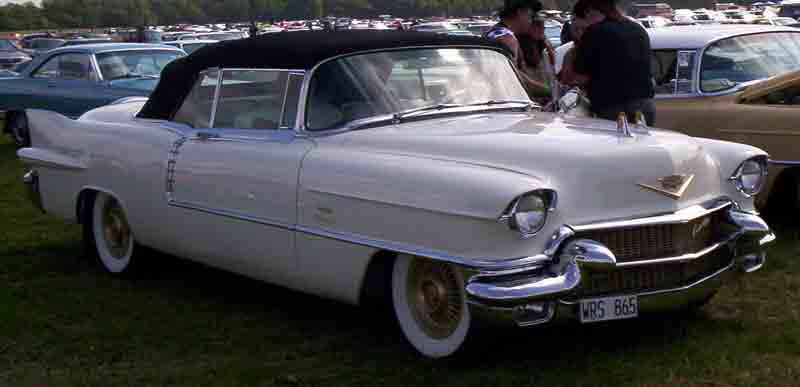
1956 Cadillac Eldorado Biarritz

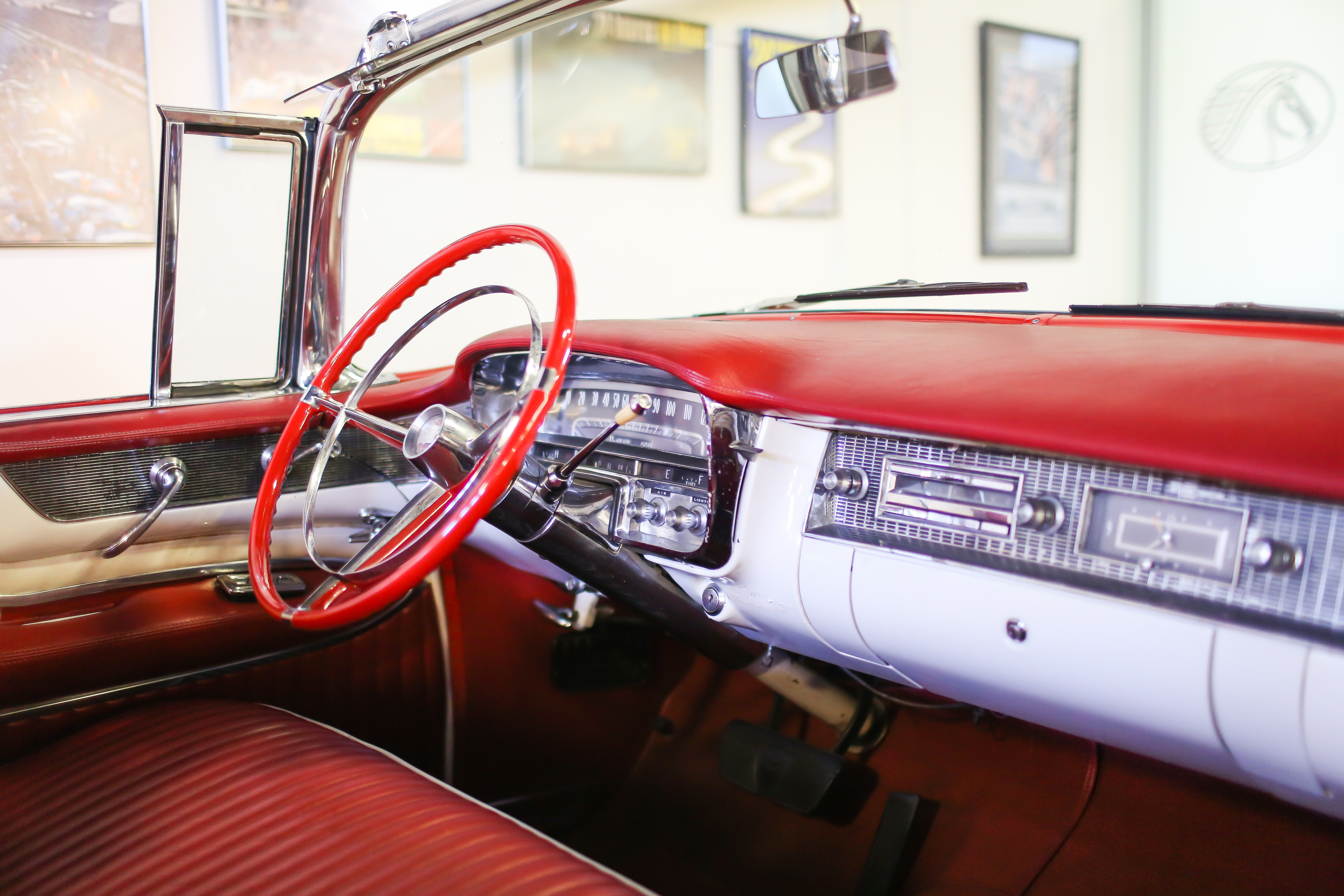
1956 Cadillac Eldorado interior

== Third generation (1957–1958) ==
Third generation 1957–1958
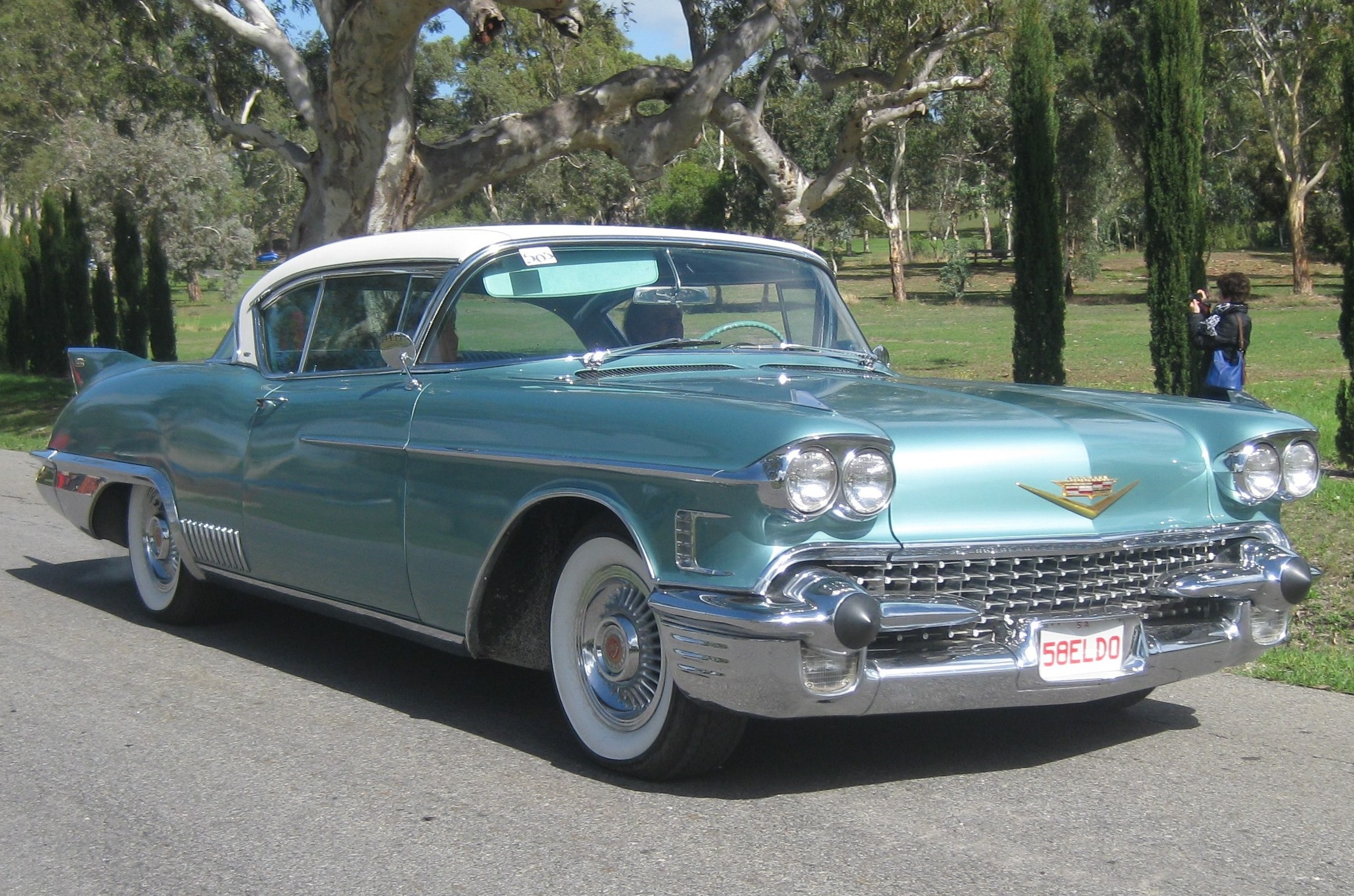
- 1958 Cadillac Eldorado Seville

Overview
- Model years: 1957–1958
- Assembly: Detroit, Michigan, United States
- Designer: Harley Earl

Body and chassis
- Body style: Series 62: 2-door hardtop 2-door convertible 4-door hardtop (4 specimen); Series 70: 4-door hardtop
- Layout: FR layout
- Platform: Series 62: C-body
- Related: Cadillac Series 62; Buick Limited; Oldsmobile 98

Powertrain
- Engine: 365 cu in (6.0 L) OHV V8
- Transmission: 4-speed Hydra-Matic

Dimensions
- Wheelbase: Series 62: 129.5 in (3,289 mm); Series 70: 126.0 in (3,200 mm)
- Length: 1957 Series 62: 222.1 in (5,641 mm); 1958 Series 62: 223.4 in (5,674 mm); Series 70: 216.3 in (5,494 mm)
- Width: Series 62: 80.0 in (2,032 mm); Series 70: 78.5 in (1,994 mm)
- Height: Series 62: 59.1 in (1,501 mm); Series 70: 55.5 in (1,410 mm)
- Curb weight: 5,000–5,500 lb (2,300–2,500 kg)

Cadillac was restyled and re-engineered for 1957, with stylistic updates in 1958.

=== 1957 ===
1957 saw the Eldorado (in both Biarritz convertible and Seville hardtop body styles) receive new styling with an exclusive rear-end design featuring a low, downswept fenderline capped by pointed in-board fins. Just behind the open rear wheel housings, the lower rear quarters were trimmed with broad, sculptured stainless steel beauty panels that visually blended into the split rear wraparound bumper assemblies. A form of this unique rear-end treatment first appeared (sans fins) on the Cadillac "Interceptor" prototype from the immediate post-war era. Series 62 Eldorados (as distinct from the Series 70 Eldorado Brougham) were further distinguished by the model name above a V-shaped rear deck ornament and on the front fenders. The three section front bumper was shared with the rest of the redesigned Cadillac model line, as the Eldorados previously came with a long list of standard features. Four specially built 4-door hardtop Eldorado Sevilles were also built in 1957.

=== 1958 ===
For 1958, the car received quad headlights as the front clip was again shared with this year's updated standard Cadillacs. GM was promoting their 50th year of production, and introduced Anniversary models for Cadillac, Buick, Oldsmobile, Pontiac and Chevrolet. The 1958 models shared a common appearance on the top models for each brand; Cadillac Eldorado Seville, Buick Limited Riviera, Oldsmobile Starfire 98, Pontiac Bonneville Catalina, and the new Chevrolet Bel-Air Impala.

This year's revised front clip incorporated a new hood, a new front bumper with "dagmars" mounted lower and further apart combined with a full-width jeweled grille. On the Biarritz and Seville, a V-shaped ornament and model identification script was asymmetrically mounted to the deck lid. Other styling updates included the addition of ten vertical chrome slashes ahead of the open rear wheel housings and crest medallions on the flank of the tailfins. The split rear bumper assemblies were each updated with a low-profile combined reverse light/grille unit that replaced the previous year's separate, round exhaust exits and reverse lights; the round brake/tail light units at the base of the fins remained unchanged. The rear license plate housing was now flanked on each side by five vertical hash marks.

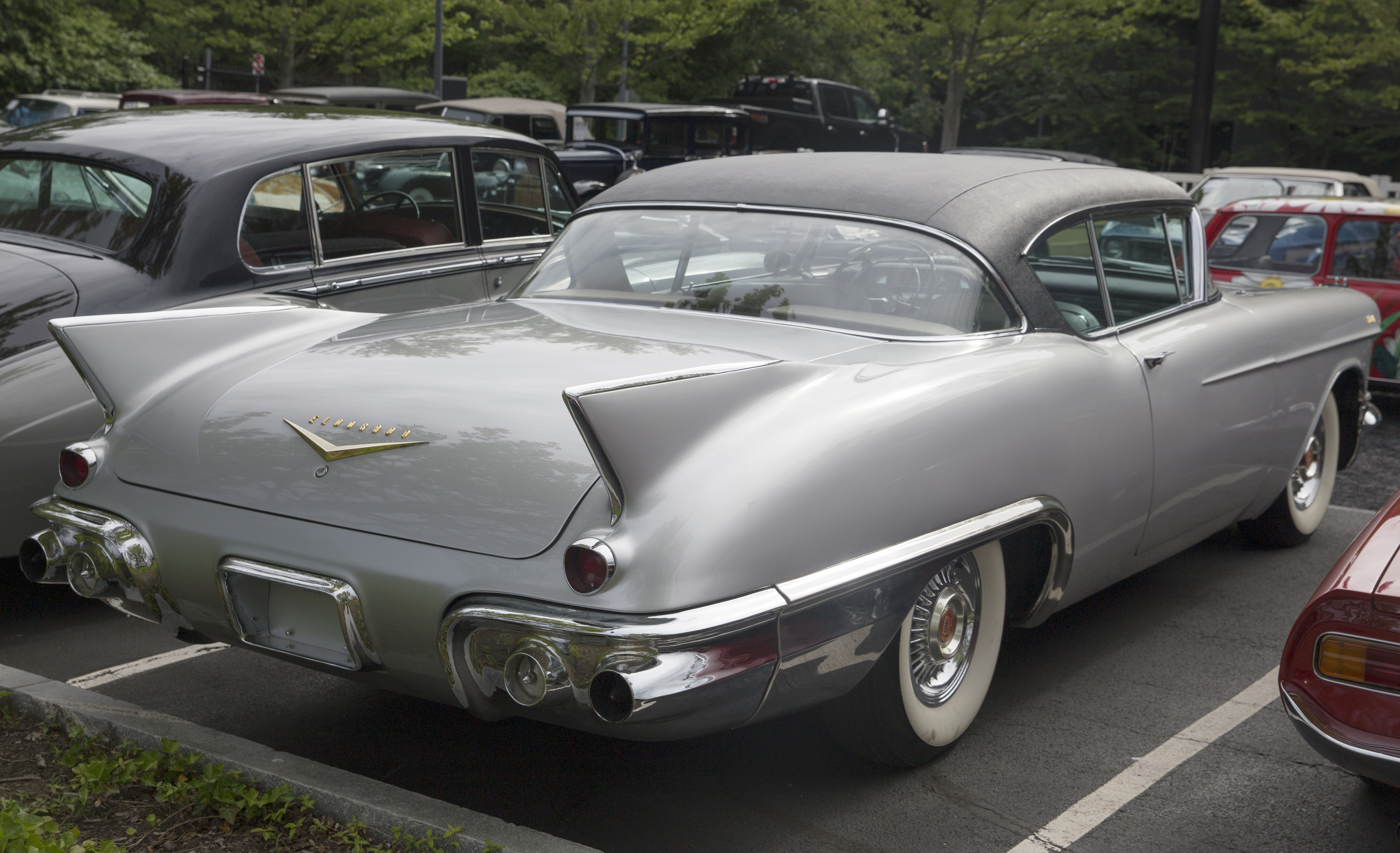
1957 Cadillac Eldorado Seville (hardtop coupe; rear)

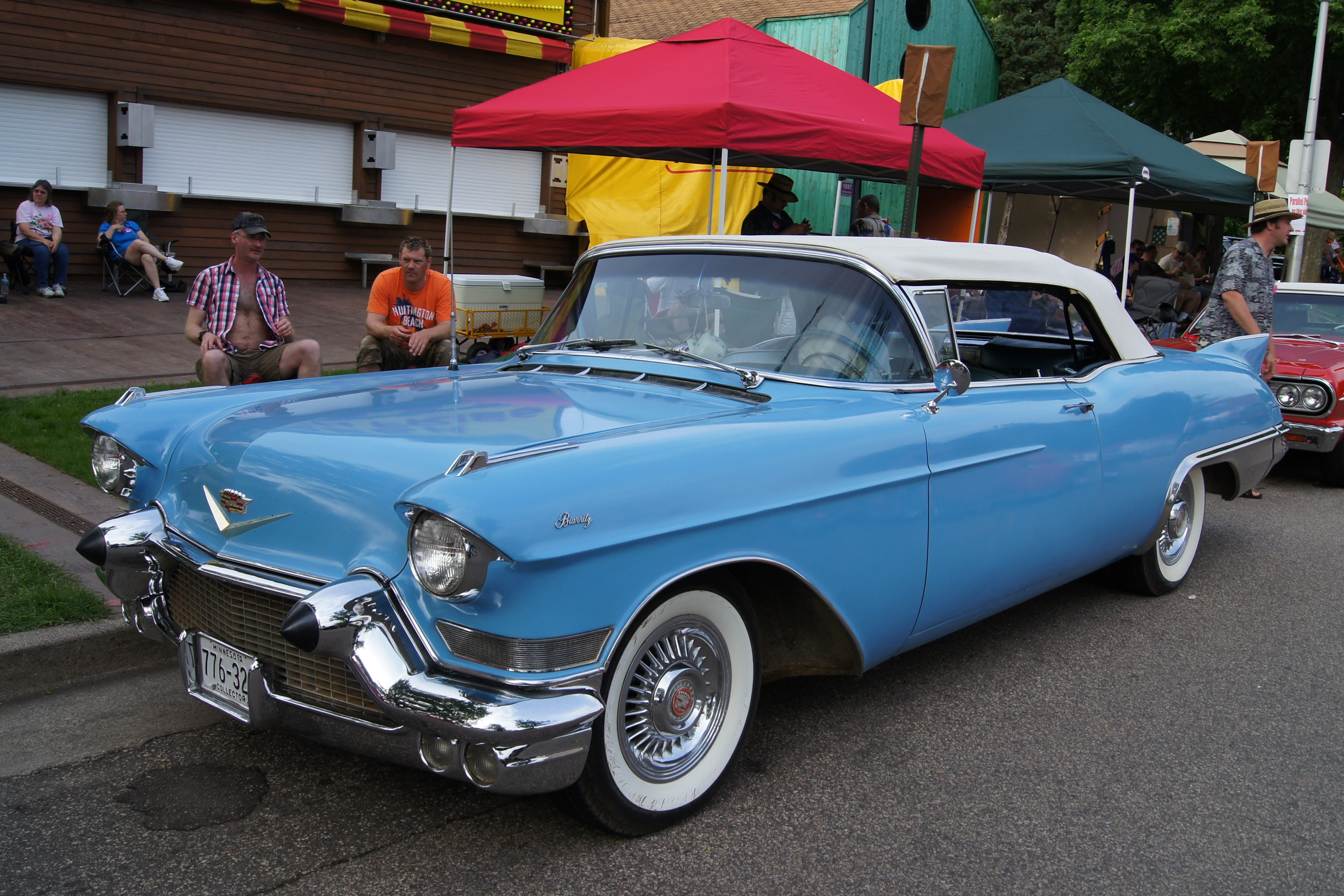
1957 Cadillac Eldorado Biarritz (convertible)

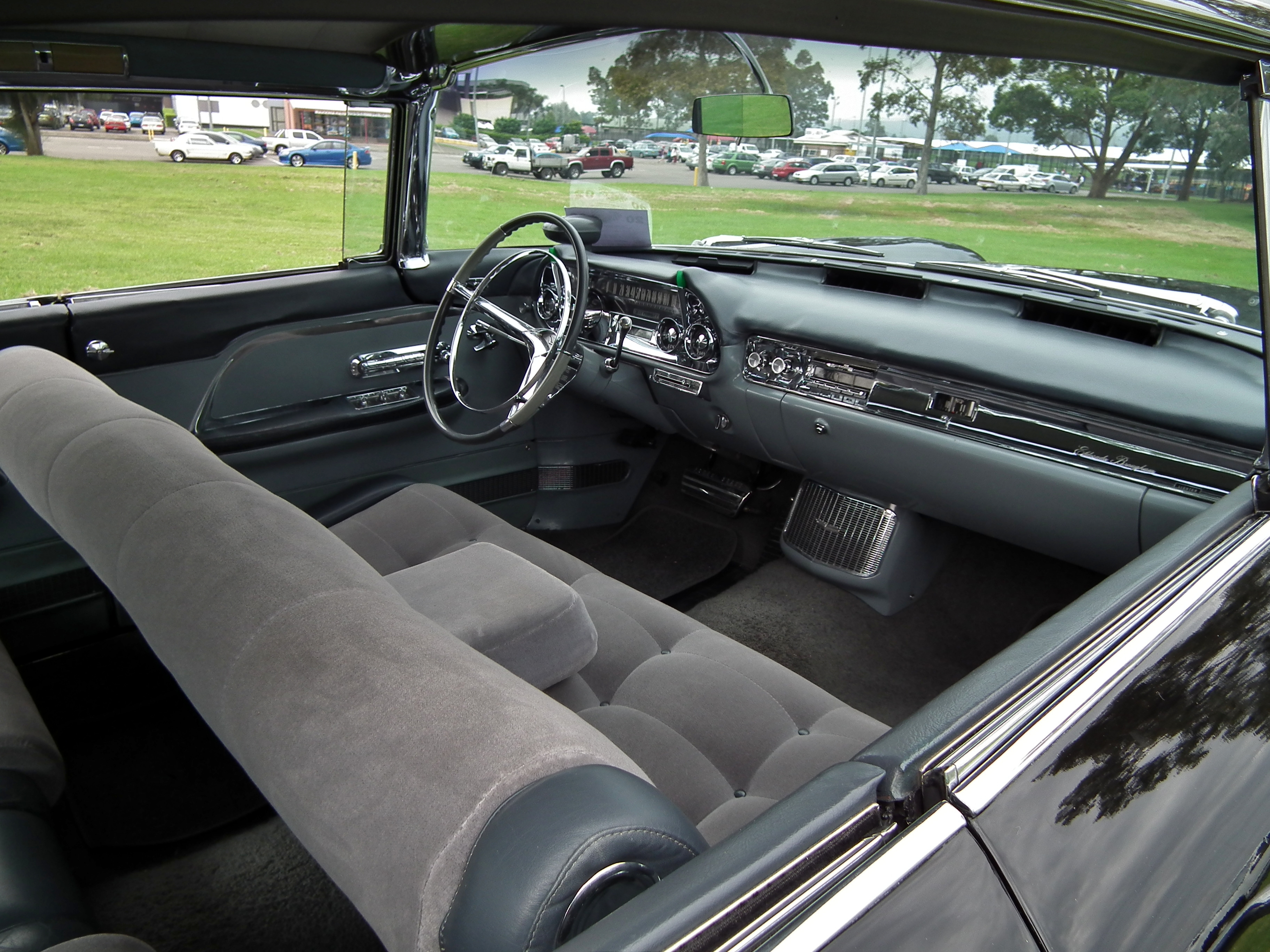
1957 Cadillac Eldorado Brougham interior

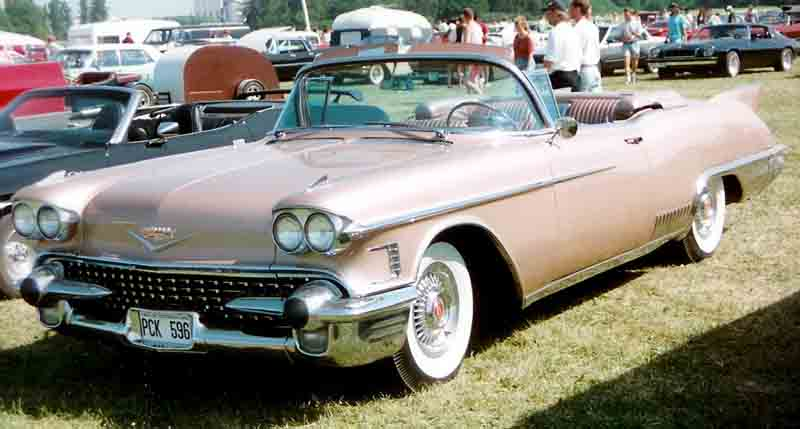
1958 Cadillac Eldorado Biarritz

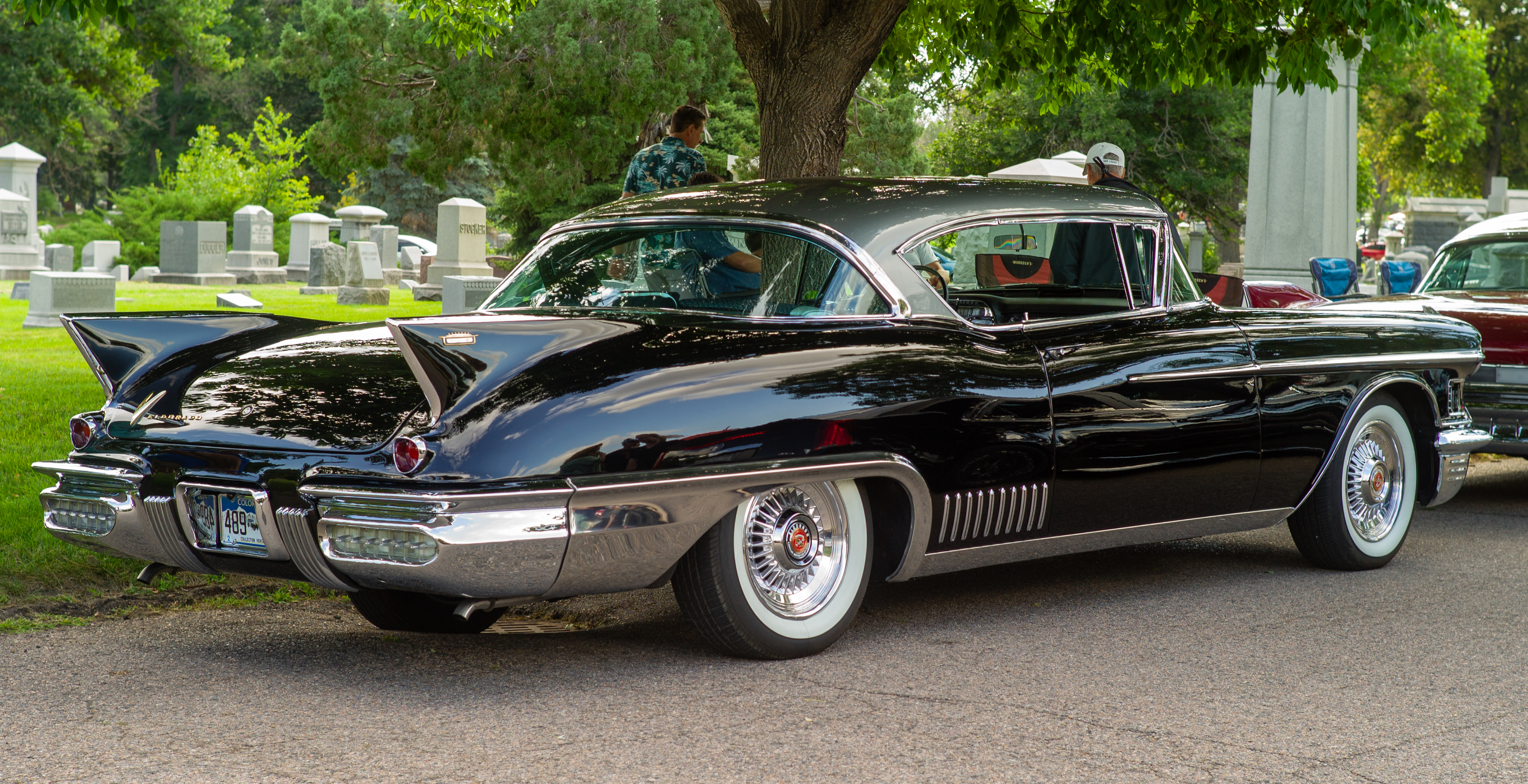
1958 Cadillac Eldorado Seville

=== 1957–1958 Eldorado Brougham ===
Announced in December 1956 and released around March 1957, the Series 70 Eldorado Brougham was a distinct, hand-built four-door ultra-luxury vehicle, derived from the Park Avenue and Orleans show cars of 1953–54. Designed by Ed Glowacke, Cadillac's 1950s design studio head, it stood out by featuring the first quad headlights (at the time still illegal in the United States), and other unique trim, foremost a brushed stainless steel pillarless hardtop. Like the later 1961 fourth-generation Lincoln Continental, it had rear-hinged rear doors (suicide doors), but unlike the Continental, the Brougham was a true, pillarless hardtop, as the doors latched onto a stub pillar that did not extend beyond the beltline.

It cost US$13,074 ($149,871 in 2025 dollars)—twice the price of a conventional 1957 Eldorado and more than the Rolls-Royce Silver Cloud, Facel Vega Excellence or Continental Mark II. Sales were 400 in 1957 and 304 in 1958. 1958 was the last year for the domestic production of the hand-built Brougham at Cadillac's Detroit factory, as future manufacturing of the special bodies was transferred to Pinin Farina in Turin, Italy. It was a marketing approach revival used in the early 1930s with the Cadillac V-16 with similar attention to detail and engineering pursuits as a halo car.

The car featured a roof trimmed in brushed stainless and self-levelling air suspension. The exterior ornamentation included wide, polished lower rear quarter beauty panels extending along the rocker sills and rectangularly sculptured side body "cove" highlighted with five horizontal windsplits on the rear doors. Tail styling treatments followed the Eldorado pattern. It also had the first automatic two-position "memory" power seats, a dual four-barrel V-8, low-profile tires with thin white-walls, automatic trunk opener and closer, high-pressure cooling system, polarized sun visors, electric antenna, electric door locks and a dual heating system. Other unique features included an automatic starter with restart function, Autronic Eye, drum-type electric clock, power windows, forged aluminum wheels and air conditioning, six silver magnetic glovebox drink tumblers and an Evans leather-trimmed cigarette case and vanity kit containing a lipstick holder, ladies' powder puff with powder, comb, beveled mirror, coin holder, matching leather notebook, gold mechanical pencil, and an atomizer filled with Arpège Extrait De Lanvin perfume. Buyers of Broughams had a choice of 44 full-leather interior and trim combinations and could select such items as Mouton, Karakul, or lambskin carpeting.

There were serious difficulties with the air suspension, which proved troublesome in practice. Some owners found it cheaper to have it replaced with conventional coil springs than to keep repairing the air system.

The 1957 Eldorado Brougham joined the Sixty Special and the Series 75 as the only Cadillac models with Fleetwood bodies, although Fleetwood script or crests did not appear anywhere on the exterior of the car. This would also mark the first time in 20 years that a Fleetwood-bodied car was paired with the Brougham name.

The 1957-58 Eldorado Brougham also marked the return of the Cadillac Series 70, albeit only briefly. An all-transistor signal-seeking car radio was produced by GM's Delco division, and was first available for the 1957 Eldorado Brougham models, which was standard equipment and used 13 transistors in its circuitry.

The Eldorado Brougham received minor changes for 1958. The interior upper door panels were finished in leather instead of the metal finish used in 1957. New wheel covers also appeared. Forty-four trim combinations were available, along with 15 special monotone paint colors.

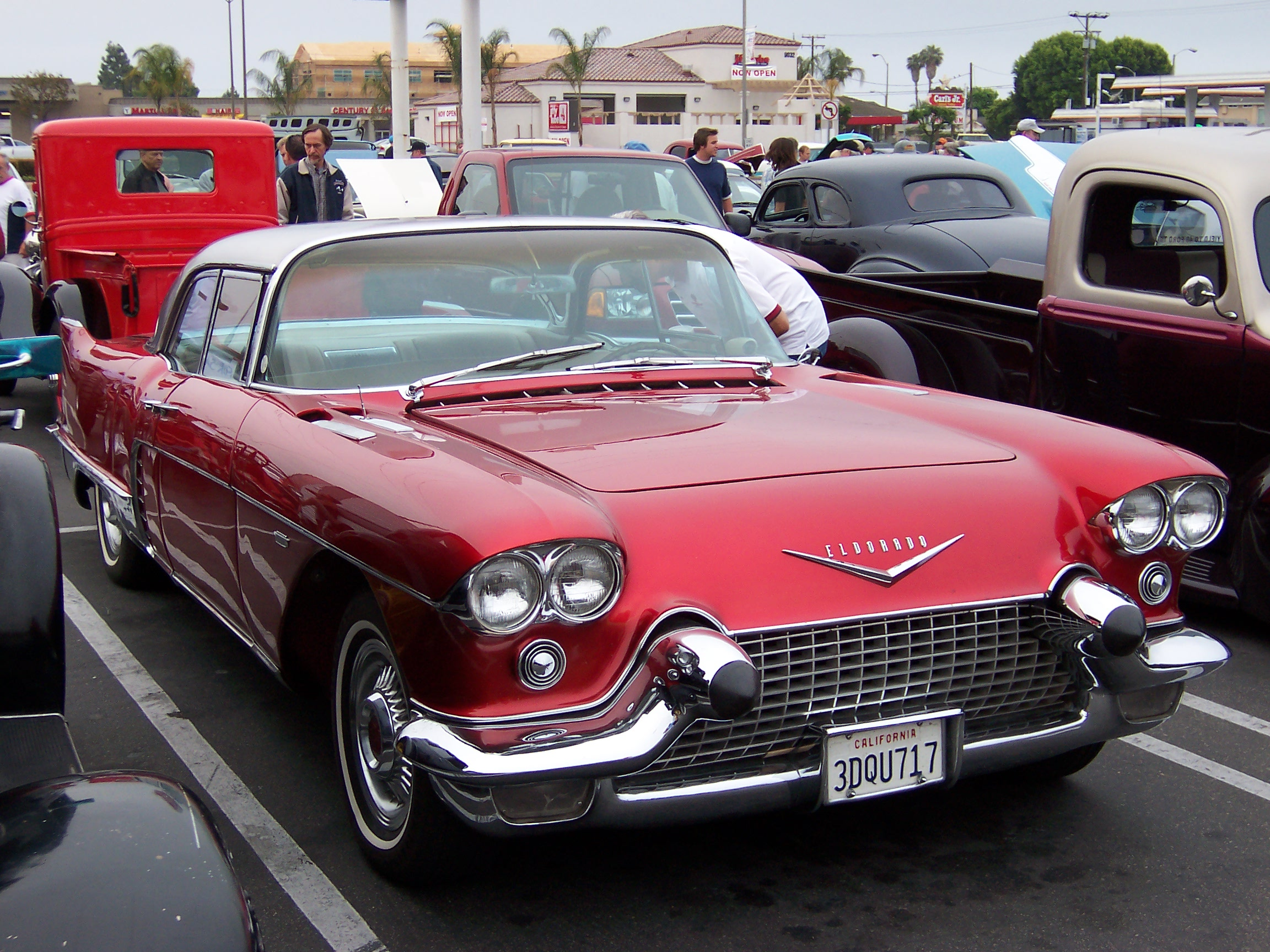
1957 Cadillac Eldorado Brougham

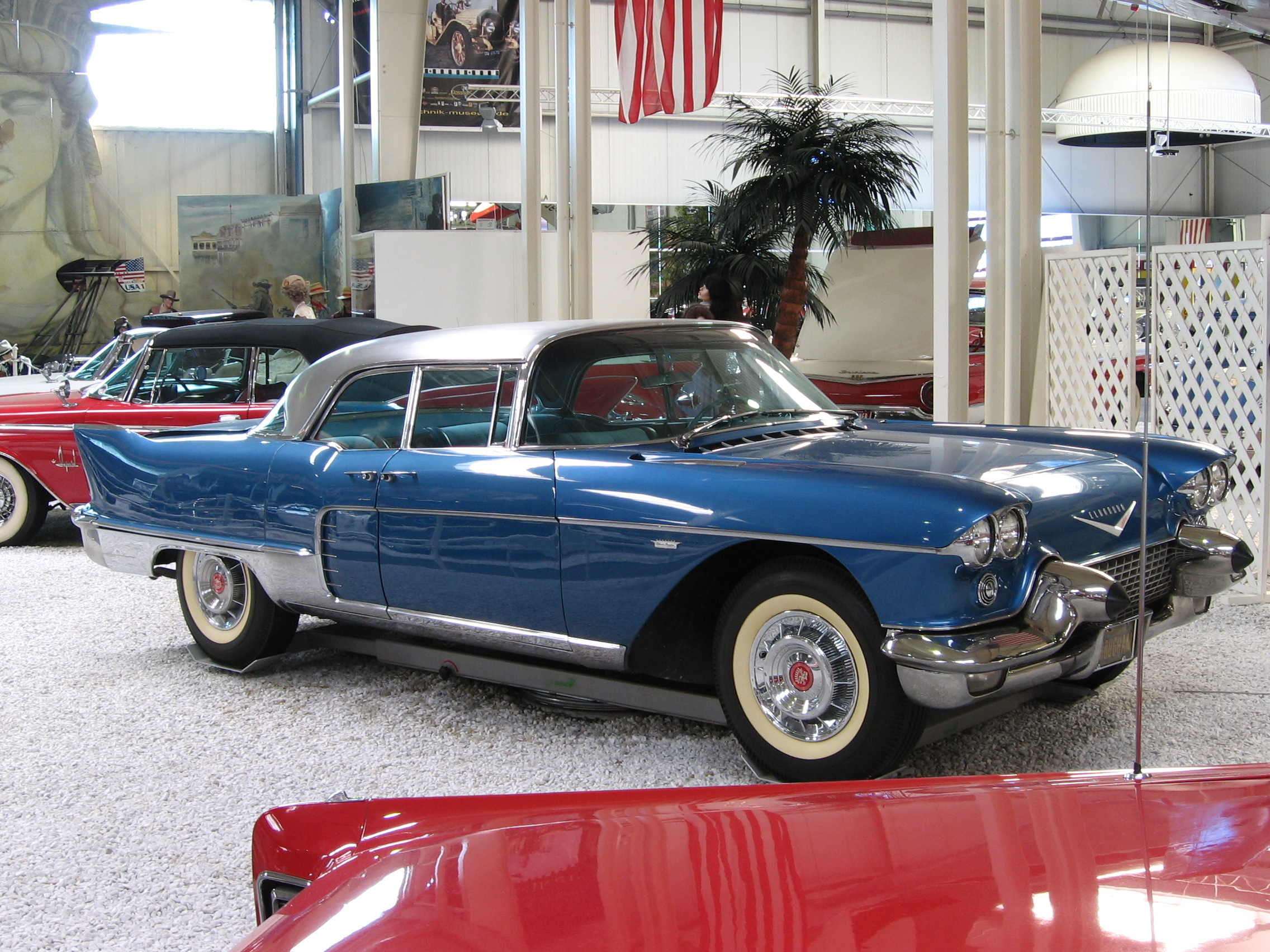
1958 Cadillac Eldorado Brougham

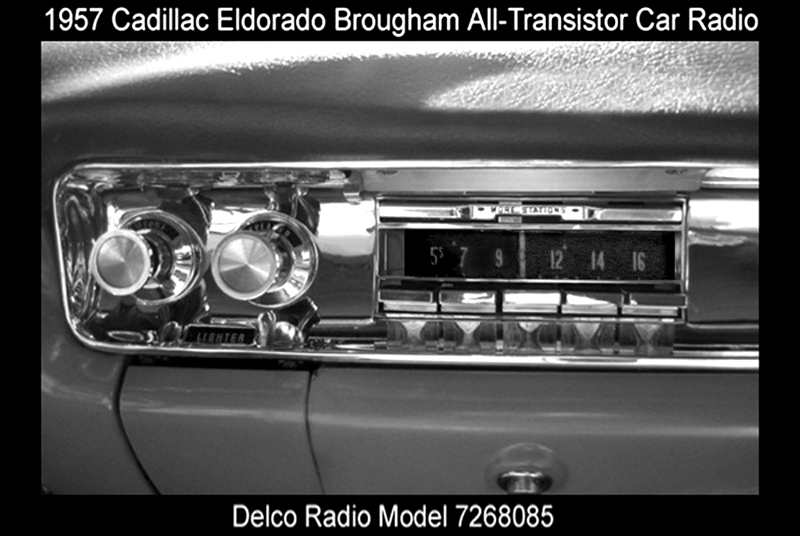
1957 Eldorado Brougham all-transistor, in-dash car radio

== Fourth generation (1959–1960) ==
Fourth generation 1959–1960
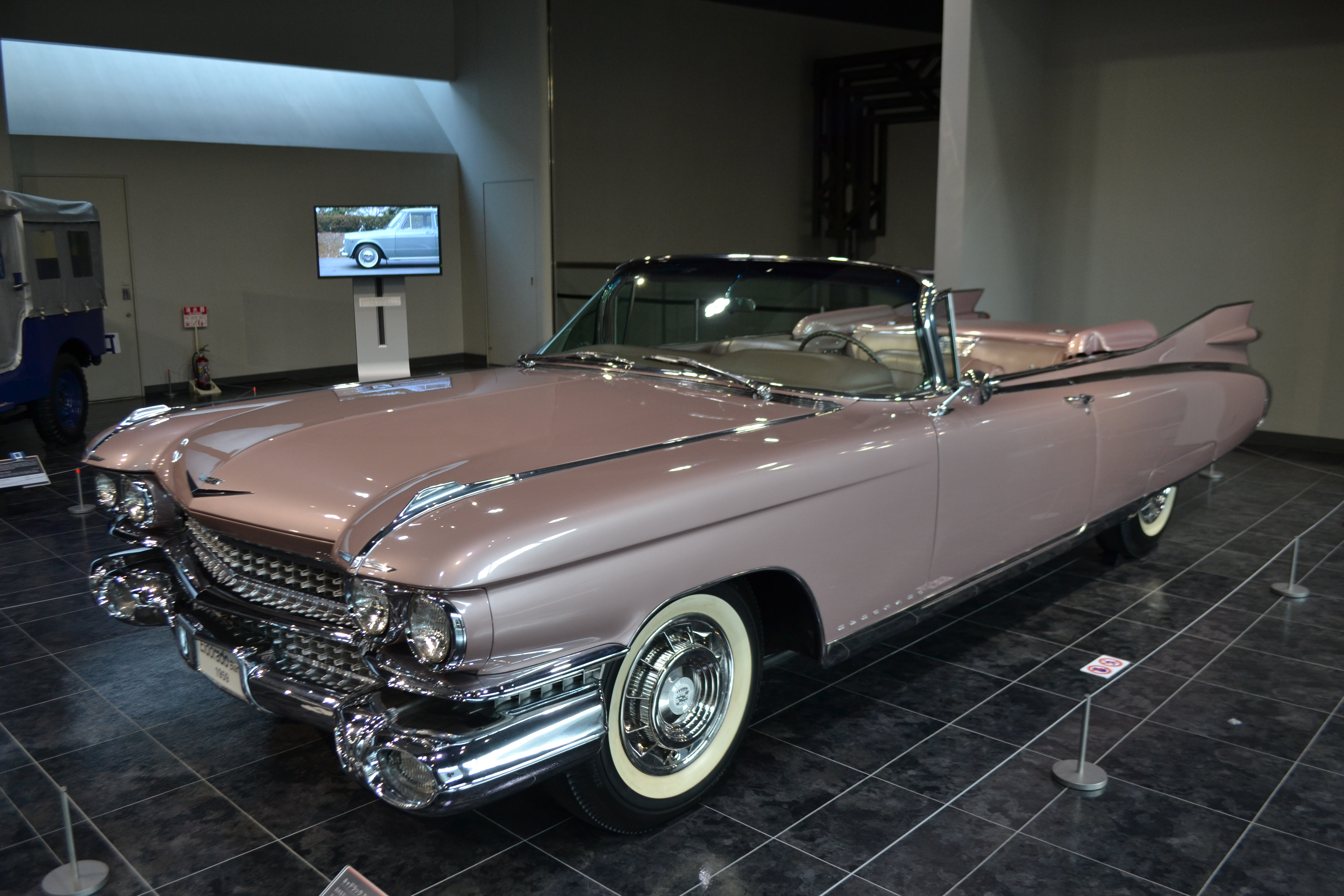
- 1959 Cadillac Eldorado Biarritz Series 6400

Overview
- Model years: 1959–1960
- Assembly: Detroit, Michigan, U.S.
- Designer: Chuck Jordan

Body and chassis
- Body style: Series 62: 2-door hardtop 2-door convertible Series 6900: 4-door hardtop
- Layout: FR layout
- Platform: C-body
- Related: Cadillac Sixty Special; Cadillac De Ville; Cadillac Series 62; Buick Electra; Oldsmobile 98

Powertrain
- Engine: 390 cu in (6.4 L) OHV V8
- Transmission: 4-speed Hydra-Matic

Dimensions
- Wheelbase: 130.0 in (3,302 mm)
- Length: 225.0 in (5,715 mm)
- Width: 1959 2-door: 80.2 in (2,037 mm); 1960 2-door: 79.9 in (2,029 mm); 4-door: 80.2 in (2,037 mm)
- Height: coupé: 54.1 in (1,374 mm) convertible: 54.4 in (1,382 mm); 4-door: 56.2 in (1,427 mm)
- Curb weight: 5,100–5,300 lb (2,300–2,400 kg)

=== 1959 ===
Along with the rest of the General Motors divisions, the bulky, originally proposed 1959 styling was abandoned in favor of a significantly lower, longer, and wider theme as an overdue response to Virgil Exner's striking redesign of the 1957 Chrysler products. The 1959 Cadillac is remembered for its huge sharp tailfins with dual bullet tail lights, two distinctive rooflines and roof pillar configurations, new jewel-like grille patterns and matching deck lid beauty panels.

For 1959, the Series 62 became the Series 6200. De Villes and two-door Eldorados were moved from the Series 62 to their own series, the Series 6300 and Series 6400 respectively, though they all, including the four-door Eldorado Brougham (which was moved from the Series 70 to Series 6900), shared the same 130 in (3,302 mm) wheelbase. New mechanical items were a "scientifically engineered" drainage system and new shock absorbers. All Eldorados were characterized by a three-deck, jeweled rear grille insert that replicated the texture of the front grille; this front/rear grille treatment was shared with the Fleetwood Sixty Special, and would continue through 1966, with textures being revised each year. The Seville and Biarritz models had the Eldorado name spelled out behind the front wheel opening, and featured broad, full-length body sill highlights that curved over the rear fender profile and back along the upper beltline region. Engine output was an even 345 hp (257 kW) from the 390 cu in (6.4 L) engine. Standard equipment included power brakes, power steering, automatic transmission, back-up lamps, windshield wipers, two-speed wipers, wheel discs, outside rearview mirror, vanity mirror, oil filter, power windows, six way power seats, heater, fog lamps, remote control deck lid, radio and antenna with rear speaker, power vent windows, air suspension, electric door locks and license frames. The Eldorado Brougham also came with air conditioning, automatic headlight dimmer, and cruise control standard over the Seville and Biarritz trim lines.

=== 1960 ===
1960 Cadillacs resemble 1959 models, but with much lower tailfins and smoother, more restrained styling.

General changes included a full-width grille, the elimination of pointed front bumper guards, increased restraint in the application of chrome trim, lower tailfins minus the twin bullet taillamps, oval shaped nacelles and front fender mounted directional indicator lamps. External variations on the Seville two-door hardtop and Biarritz convertible took the form of bright body sill highlights that extended across the lower edge of fender skirts and Eldorado block lettering on the sides of the front fenders, just behind the headlamps. Standard equipment included power brakes, power steering, automatic transmission, dual back-up lamps, windshield wipers, two-speed wipers, wheel discs, outside rearview mirror, vanity mirror, oil filter, power windows, six-way power seats, heater, fog lamps, Eldorado engine, remote control trunk lock, radio with antenna and rear speaker, power vent windows, air suspension, electric door locks, license frames, and five whitewall tires. Technical highlights were finned rear drums and an X-frame construction. Interiors were done in Chadwick cloth or optional Chambray cloth and leather combinations. The last Eldorado Seville was built in 1960.

The 1960 Cadillac Eldorado Biarritz 6467E is featured as Maurice Minnifield's vehicle in the 1990s television series Northern Exposure.

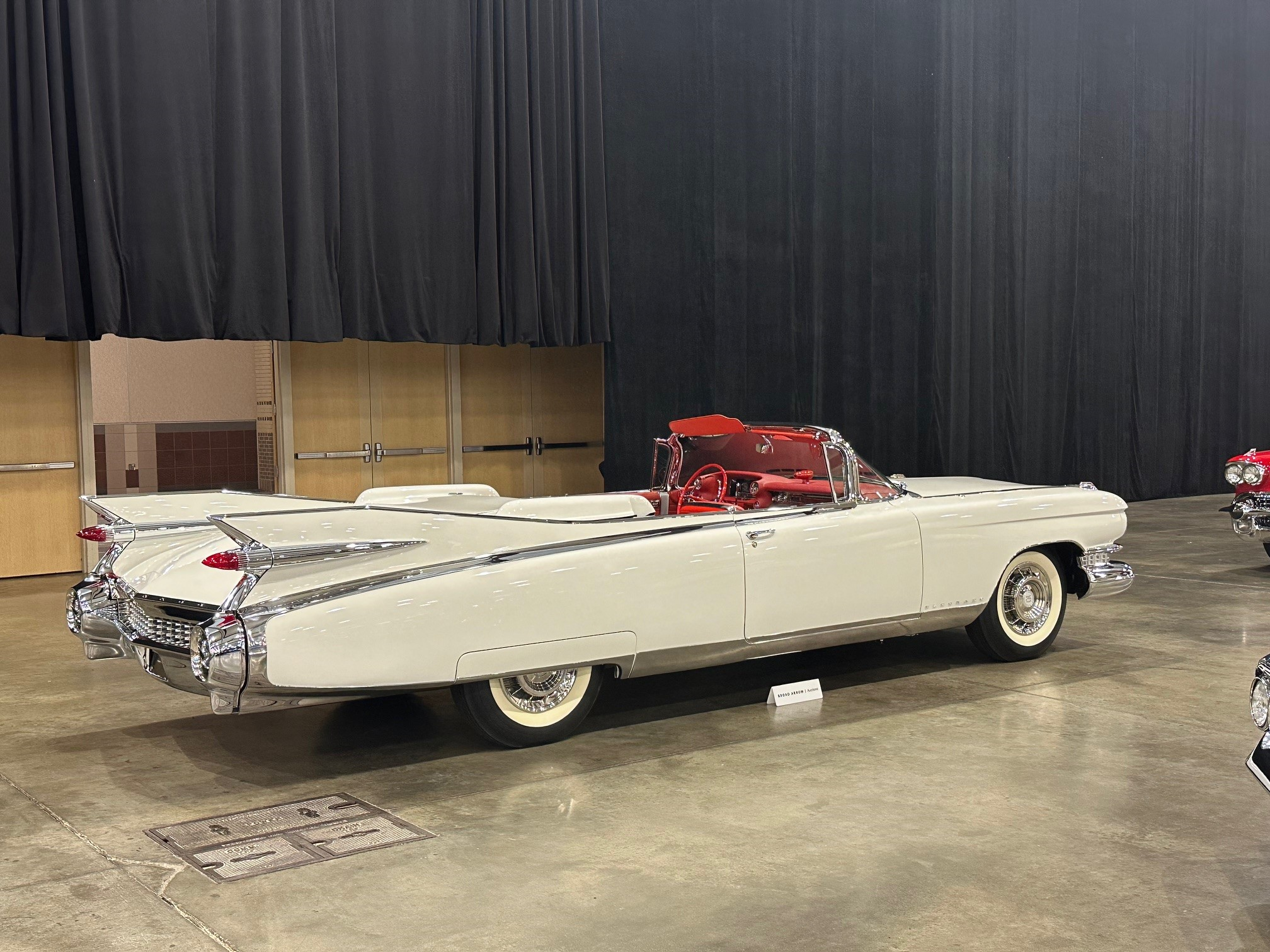
1959 Cadillac Eldorado Biarritz Convertible

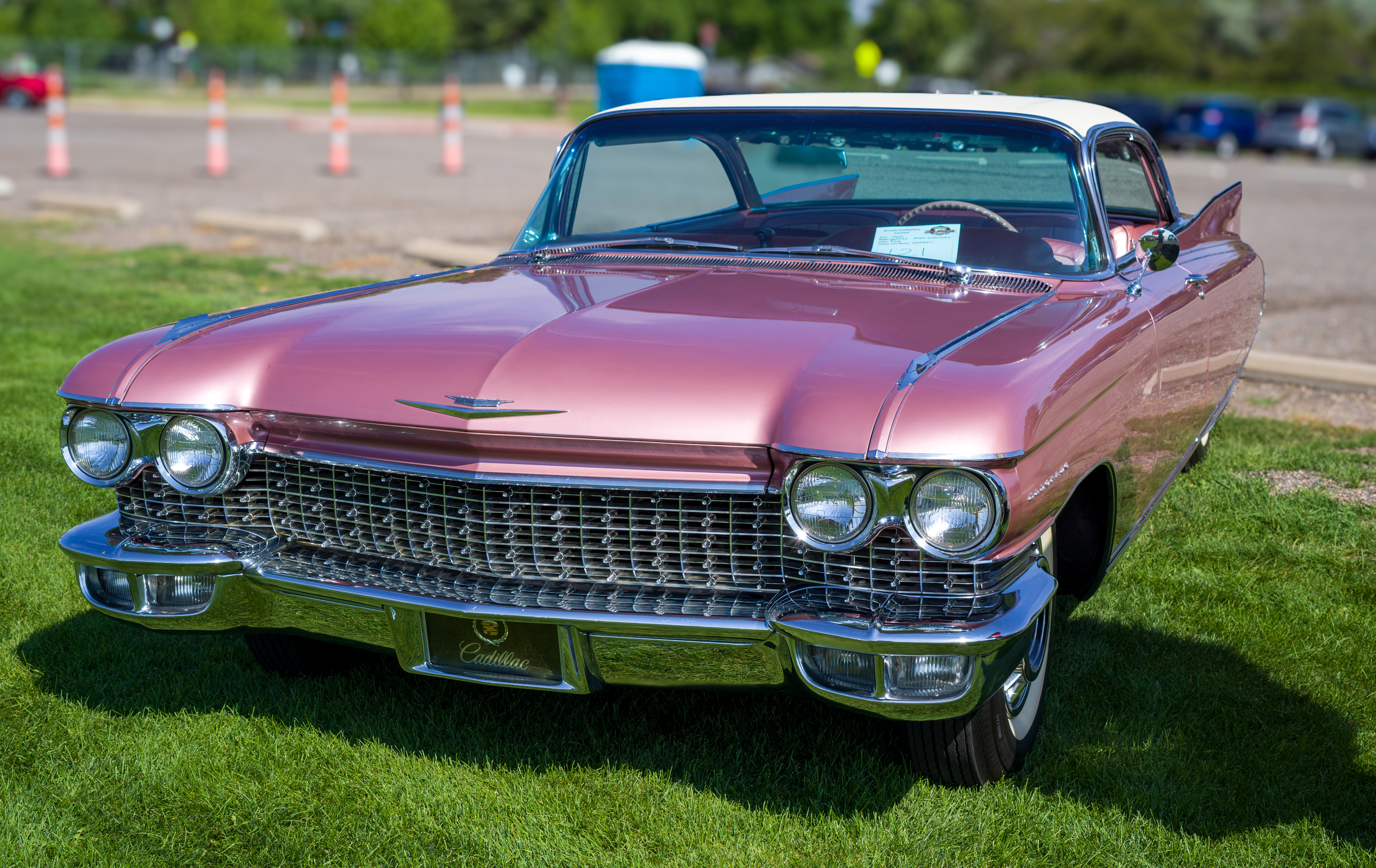
1960 Cadillac Eldorado in Siena Rose Metallic

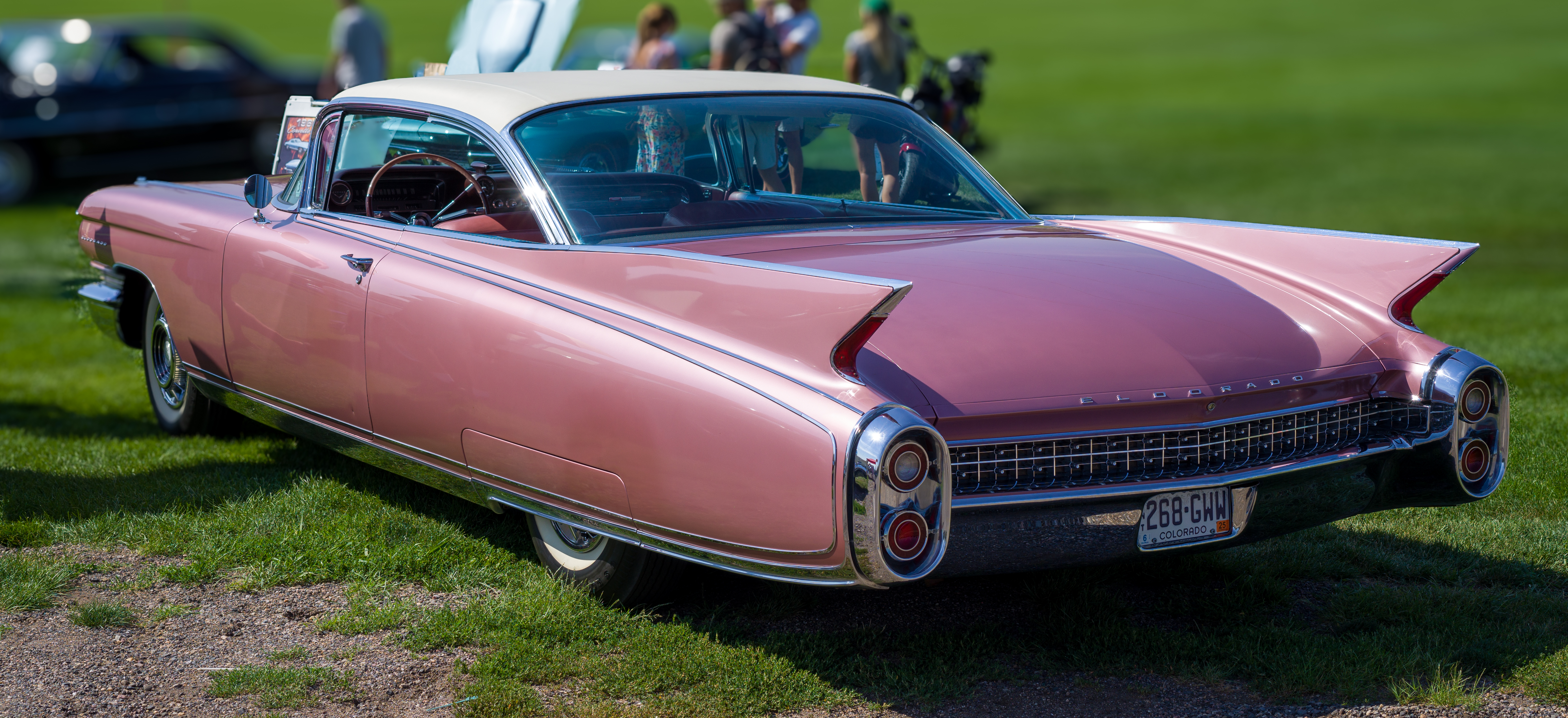
1960 Cadillac Eldorado in Siena Rose Metallic

=== 1959–1960 Eldorado Brougham ===
For the 1959 and 1960 model years, the Eldorado Brougham became longer, lower, and wider. The Brougham featured narrow taillights integrated into low tailfins; an angular rear roofline with rear ventiplanes that contrasted to the rounded roofline; and the dual rocket-like taillights and tall fins of the standard 1959 models. Front and rear bumper assemblies were shared with the standard Cadillacs.

Designed in-house, Cadillac contracted with Pinin Farina of Turin, Italy for the manufacture of the low-volume model. The Eldorado Broughams were among the first Cadillacs to be hand-built in Italy; concept cars were also hand built as needed. Cadillac chassis were sent by boat to the port of Savona, Italy, where they were then delivered to the factory in Turin at Grugliasco, mated with the body, and sent back to Detroit by boat.

Priced at $13,075 ($144,407 in 2025 dollars), the Brougham cost $1 more than their older siblings, and did not sell as well as their forebears.

A vertical crest medallion with Brougham script plate appeared on the front fenders and a single, thin molding ran from the front to rear along the mid-sides of the body. The Brougham did not have Eldorado front fender letters or Eldorado-specific body edge highlight trim. For 1960, new standard model bumpers were incorporated and a fin-like crest or skeg ran from behind the front wheel opening to the rear of the car on the lower bodyside with the crest medallions relocated to the trailing edge of the rear fenders. The standard equipment list matched those of other Eldorados, plus Cruise Control, Autronic Eye, air conditioning and E-Z Eye glass.

The Eldorado Brougham was moved to its own unique Series 6900 from Series 70 for its remaining two years.

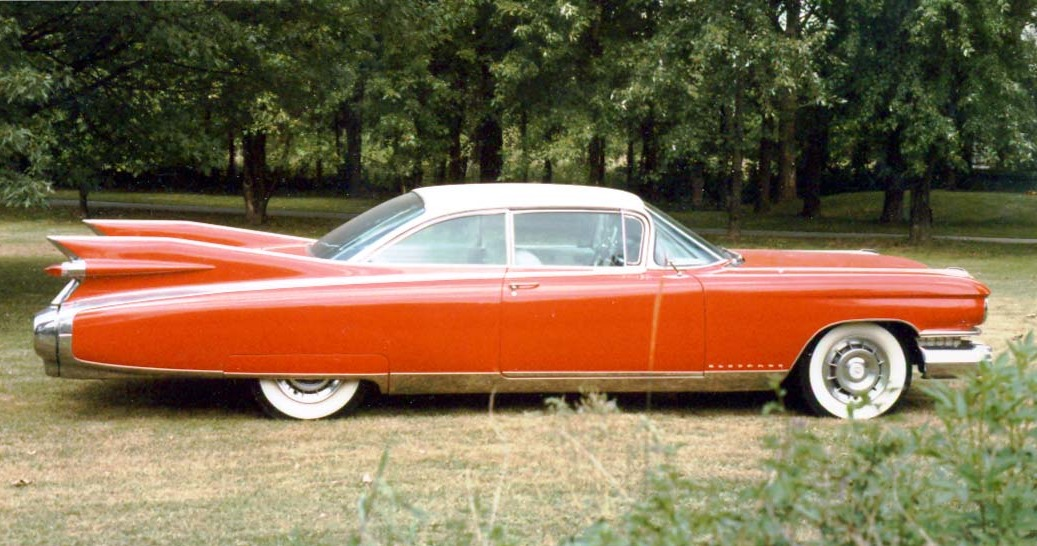
1959 Cadillac Eldorado Seville

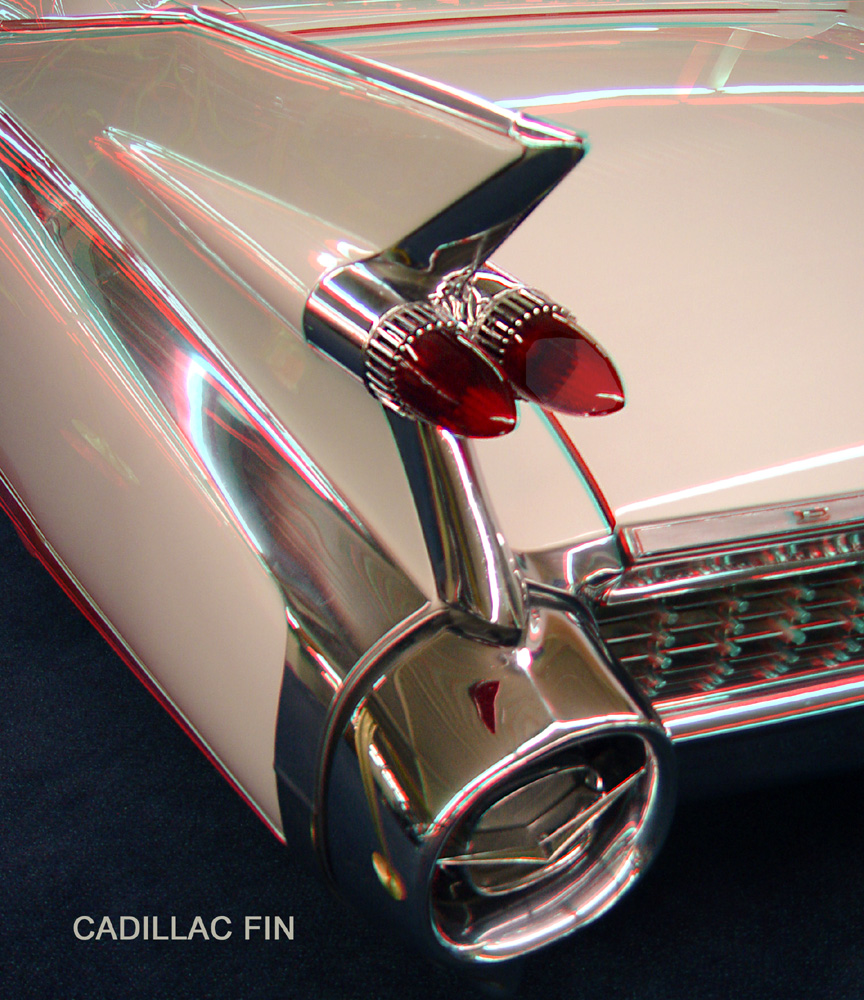
1959 Cadillac "rocketship" taillights and flamboyant fins

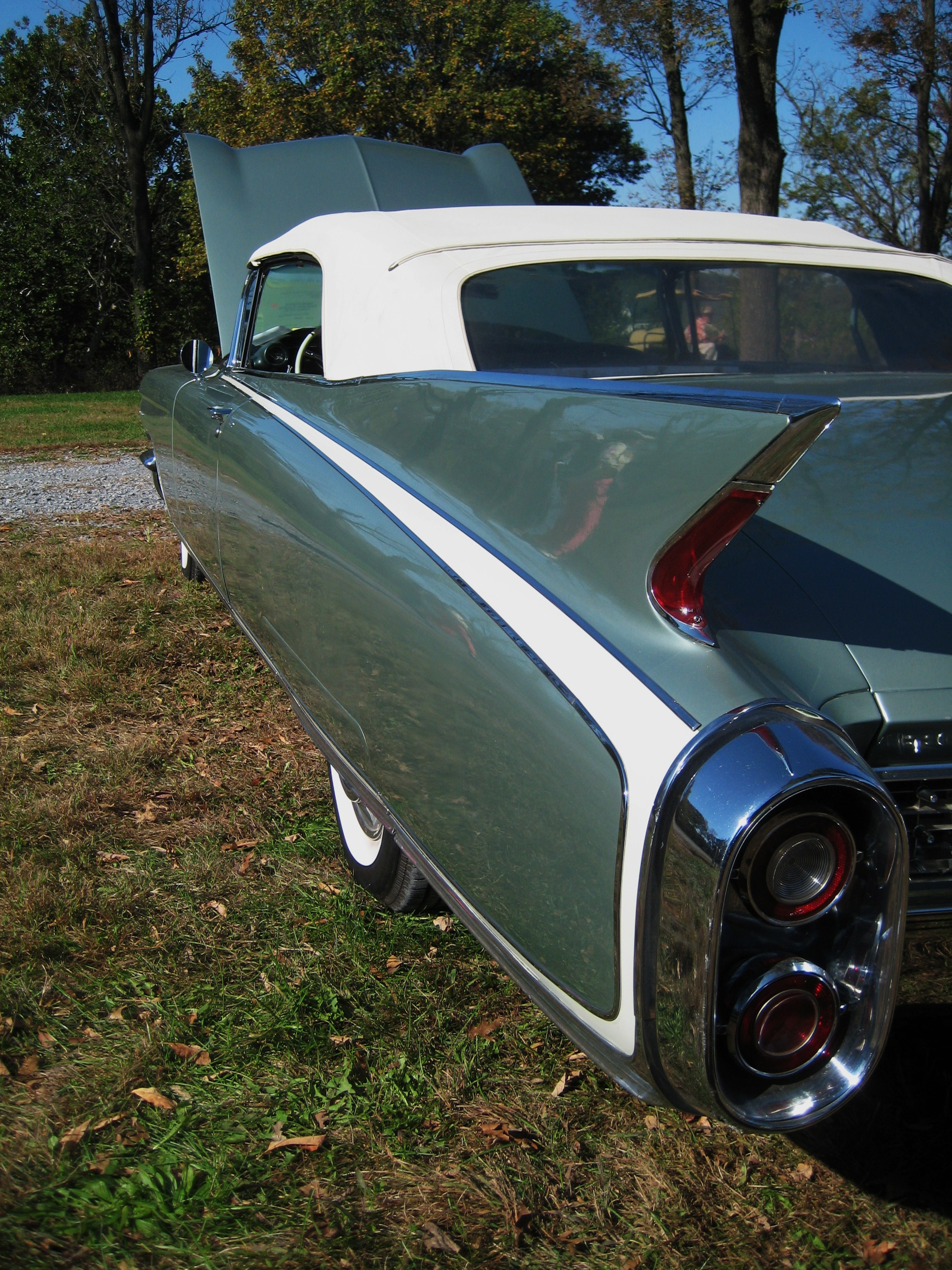
1960 Cadillac Eldorado

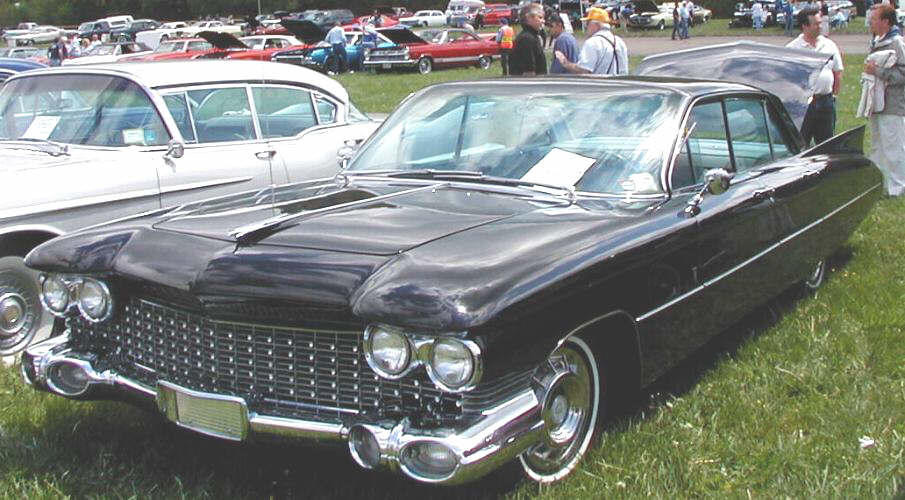
1959 Cadillac Eldorado Brougham, showing the more modest tail fin design to come to all Cadillacs in 1960

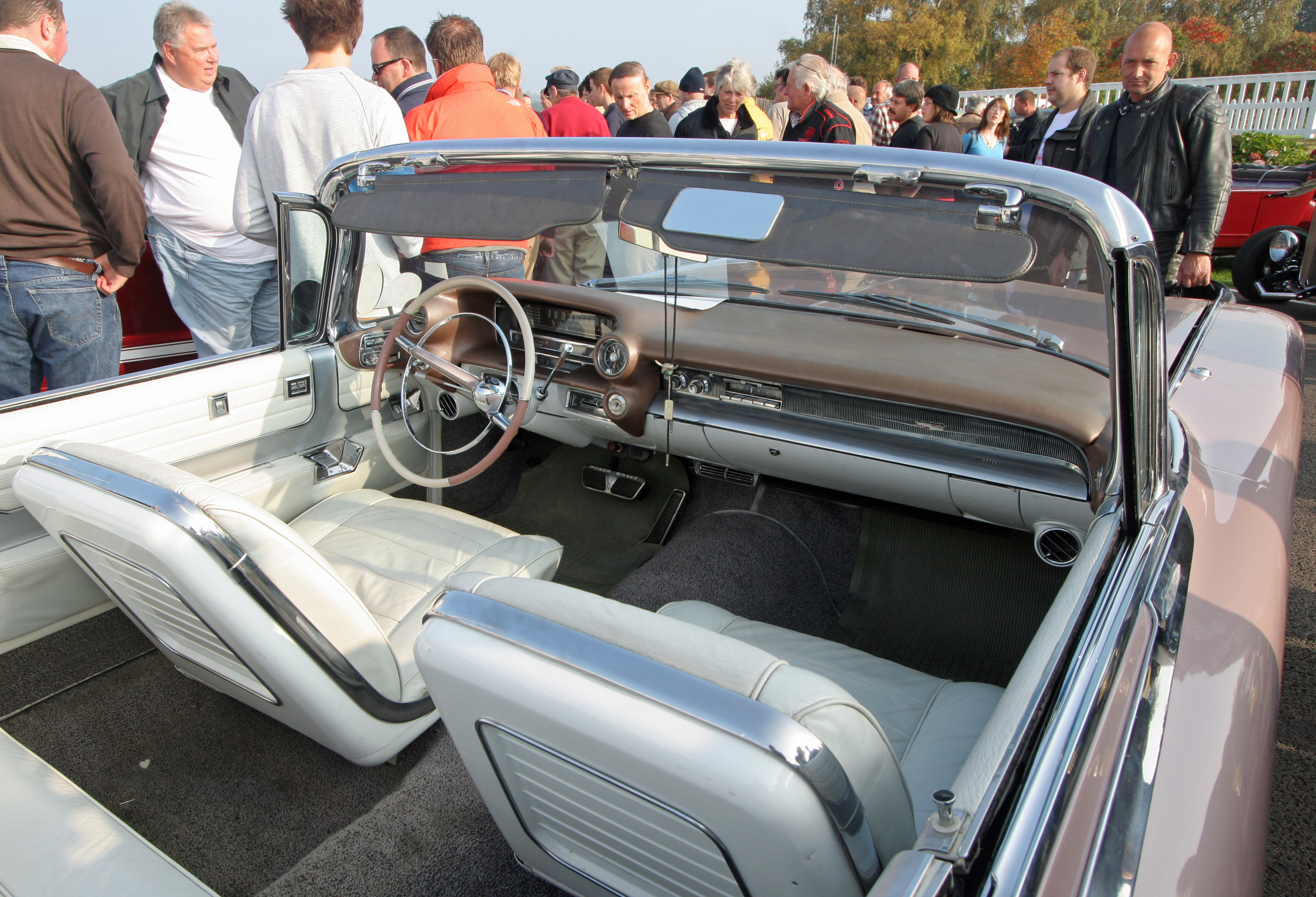
1959 Cadillac Eldorado interior

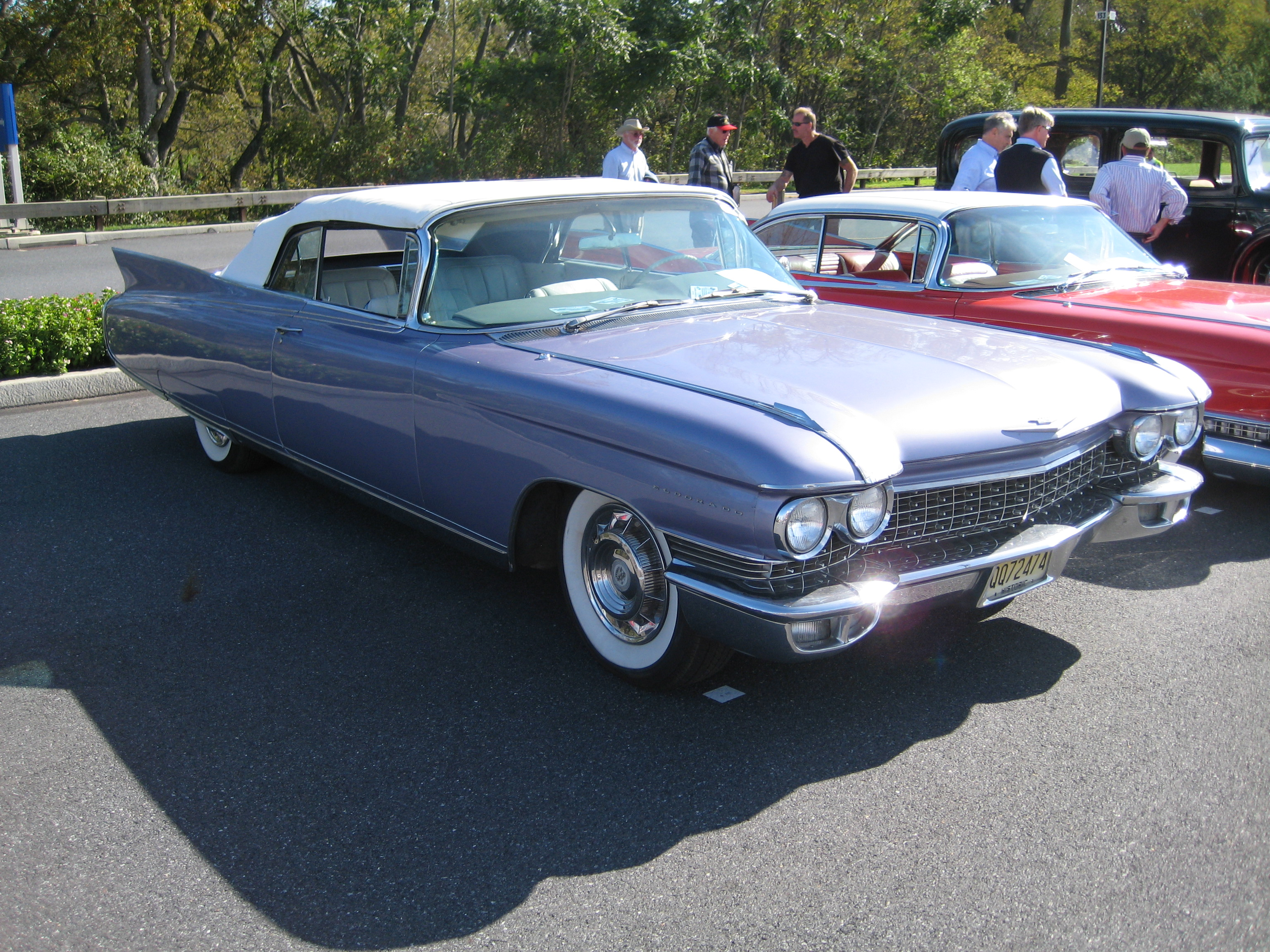
1960 Cadillac Eldorado Biarritz

== Fifth generation (1961–1962) ==
Fifth generation
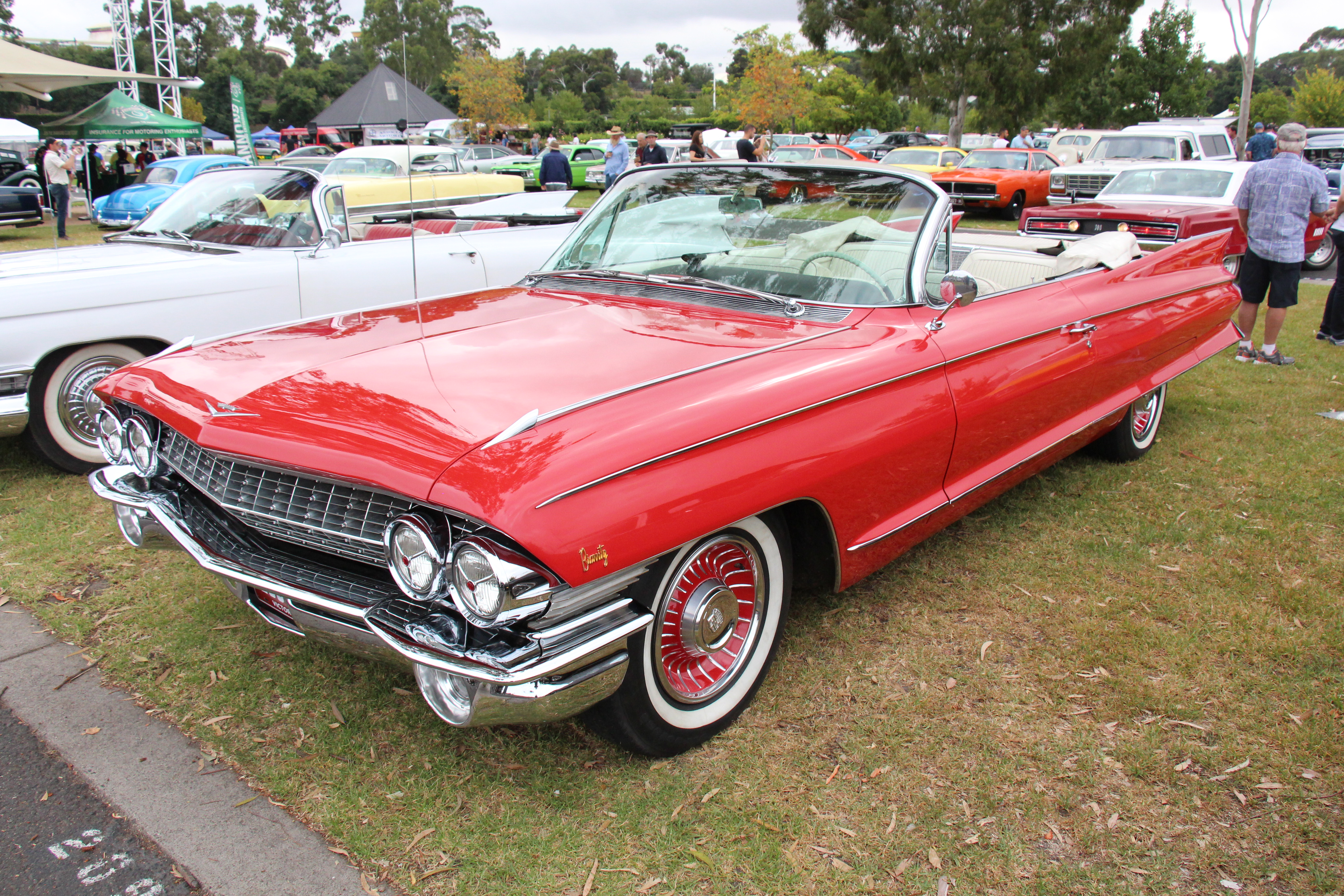
- 1961 Eldorado Biarritz Convertible

Overview
- Model years: 1961–1962
- Assembly: Detroit, Michigan, U.S.
- Designer: Bill Mitchell

Body and chassis
- Body style: 2-door convertible
- Layout: FR layout
- Platform: C-body
- Related: Cadillac Sixty Special; Cadillac De Ville; Cadillac Series 62; Buick Electra; Oldsmobile 98

Powertrain
- Engine: 390 cu in (6.4 L) OHV V8
- Transmission: 4-speed Hydra-Matic, automatic

Dimensions
- Wheelbase: 129.5 in (3,289 mm)
- Length: 1961–62: 222.0 in (5,639 mm)
- Width: 1961: 79.8 in (2,027 mm); 1962: 79.9 in (2,029 mm)
- Curb weight: 4,800–5,000 lb (2,200–2,300 kg)

=== 1961 ===
All Cadillacs were restyled and re-engineered for 1961. The Eldorado Biarritz convertible (6367) was technically reclassified as a subseries of the De Ville (Series 6300), a status it would keep through 1964. An Eldorado convertible would remain in the Cadillac line through 1966, but its differences from the rest of the line would be generally more modest. The new convex jeweled grille slanted back towards both the bumper and the hood lip, along the horizontal plane, and sat between dual headlamps. New rear-slanting front pillars with a reverse-curved base (as first used on the 1959-60 Broughams) with a somewhat less expansive windshield was incorporated. The Eldorado Biarritz featured front series designation scripts and a lower body "skeg" trimmed with a thin three quarter length spear molding running from behind the front wheel opening to the rear of the car. Standard equipment included power brakes, power steering, automatic transmission, dual reverse lights, vanity mirror, power windows, 6-way power bench seat, power vent windows. whitewall tires. Options; bucket seats, RH outside rearview mirror remote control trunk lock and a trumpet horn. Rubber-isolated front and rear coil springs replaced the trouble prone air suspension system. Four-barrel induction systems were now the sole power choice and dual exhaust were no longer available. With the Seville and Brougham gone, sales fell to 1,450.

=== 1962 ===
A mild facelift characterized Cadillac styling trends for 1962. A flatter, upright grille with a thicker horizontal center bar and more delicate cross-hatched insert appeared. Ribbed chrome trim panel, seen ahead of the front wheel housings in 1961, were now replaced with cornering lamps and front fender model and series identification badges were eliminated. More massive front bumper end pieces appeared and housed rectangular parking lamps. At the rear, tail lamps were now housed in vertically oriented rectangular nacelles designed with an angled peak at the center. A vertically ribbed rear beauty panel replicating the grille treatment appeared on the deck lid latch panel. A "Cadillac" script also appeared on the lower left side of the grille. Standard equipment included all of the previous year's equipment, as well as a remote-controlled outside rearview mirror, heater, defroster and front cornering lamps. Cadillac refined the ride and quietness, with more insulation in the floor and behind the firewall.

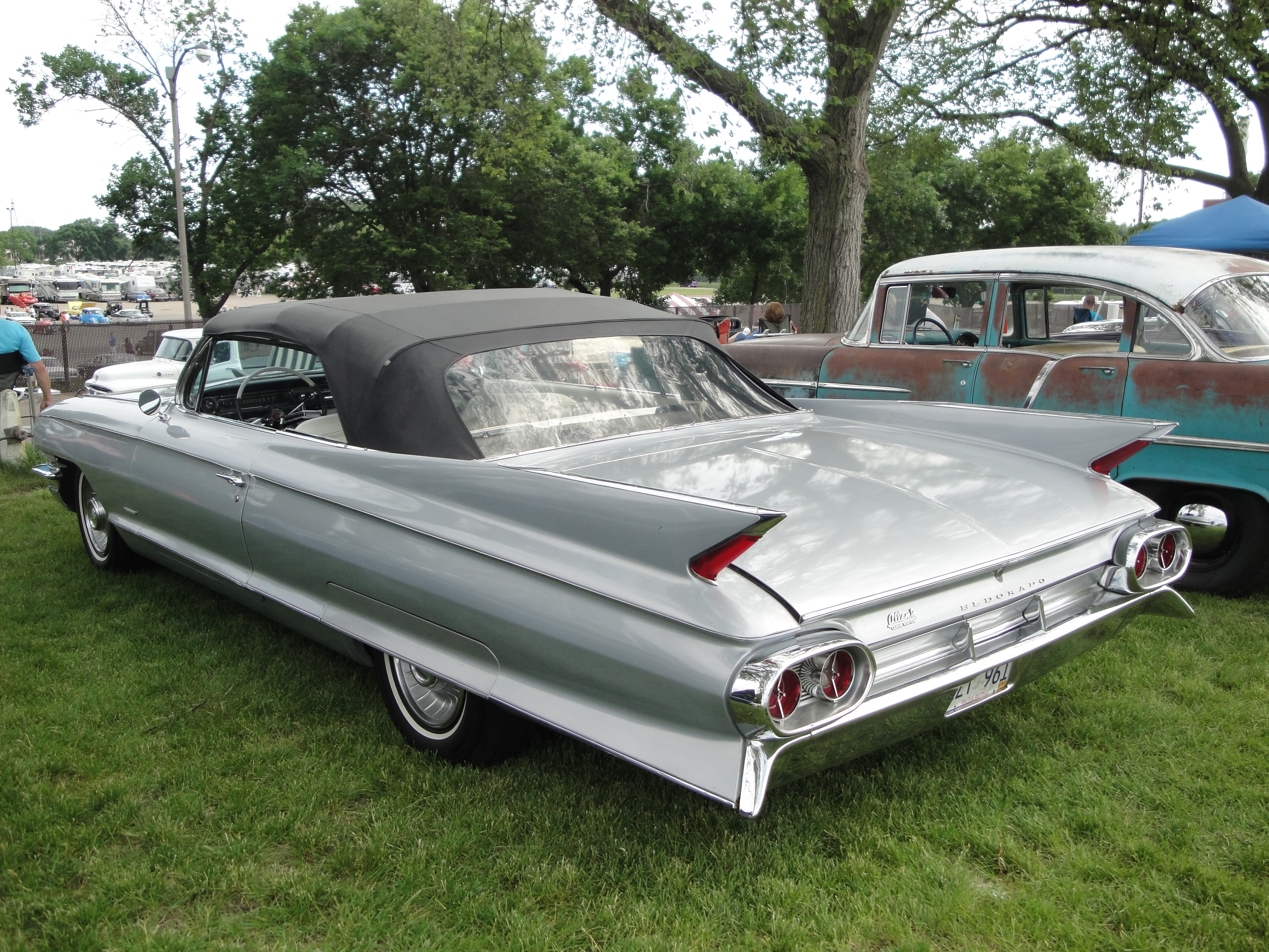
1961 Cadillac Eldorado (rear)

== Sixth generation (1963–1964) ==
Sixth generation
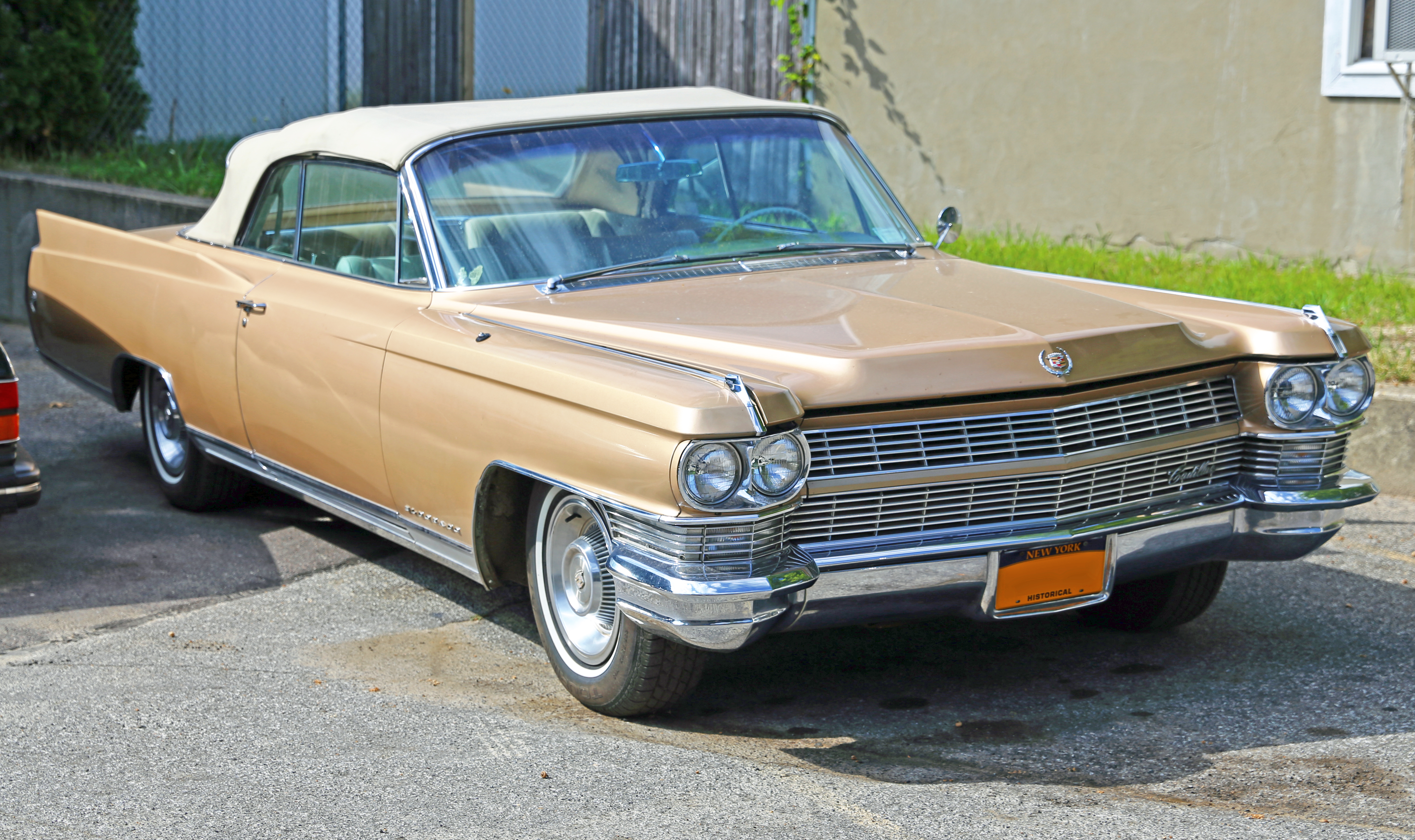
- 1964 Eldorado Biarritz convertible

Overview
- Model years: 1963–1964
- Assembly: Detroit, Michigan, U.S.
- Designer: Bill Mitchell

Body and chassis
- Body style: 2-door convertible
- Layout: FR layout
- Platform: C-body
- Related: Cadillac Sixty Special; Cadillac De Ville; Cadillac Series 62; Buick Electra; Oldsmobile 98

Powertrain
- Engine: 390 cu in (6.4 L) OHV V8; 429 cu in (7.0 L) OHV V8
- Transmission: 1963: 4-speed Hydra-Matic; 1964: 3-speed TH-400, automatic

Dimensions
- Wheelbase: 129.5 in (3,289 mm)
- Length: 1963: 223.0 in (5,664 mm); 1964: 223.5 in (5,677 mm)
- Width: 1963: 79.7 in (2,024 mm); 1964: 79.5 in (2,019 mm)
- Curb weight: 4,800–5,000 lb (2,200–2,300 kg)

=== 1963 ===
In 1963, the Eldorado Biarritz joined the Cadillac Sixty Special and the Cadillac Series 75 as the only Cadillac models with Fleetwood bodies, thus acquiring the Fleetwood wreath and crest on its rear quarters and Fleetwood rocker panel moldings. The 1963 Eldorado was also the first Fleetwood bodied convertible since the Cadillac Series 75 stopped offering four- and two-door convertible body styles and production of the Cadillac Series 90 (V16) ceased in 1941. In overall terms, the 1963 Cadillac was essentially the same as the previous year. The completely redesigned body imparted a bolder and more angular look. The front fenders projected 4.625 inches further forward than in 1962, while the tailfins were trimmed down somewhat to provide a lower profile. Body side sculpturing was eliminated in favor of smooth, flatter slab sides. The slightly V-shaped radiator grille was taller and now incorporated outer extensions that swept below the dual headlamps and housed small circular front parking lamps. The Eldorado also had a rectangular front and rear grille pattern that it again shared with the Fleetwood Sixty Special. A total of 143 options including bucket seats with wool, leather or nylon upholstery fabrics and wood veneer facings on dash, doors and seatbacks, set an all-time record for interior appointment choices. Standard equipment was the same as the previous year. The engine was entirely changed, though the displacement and output remained the same, 390 cu in (6.4 L) and 325 hp (242 kW).

=== 1964 ===
The Eldorado received a minor facelift for 1964. The main visual cue indicating an Eldorado Biarritz rather than a De Ville convertible was simply the lack of fender skirts. New up front was a bi-angular grille that formed a V-shape along both its vertical and horizontal planes, bisected by a central body-colored horizontal bar. Outer grille extension panels again housed the parking and cornering lamps. It was the 17th consecutive year for the Cadillac tailfins with a new fine-blade design carrying on the tradition. Performance improvements including a larger 429 cubic inch V8 engine were the dominant changes for the model run. Equipment features were same as in 1963 for the most part. Comfort Control, a completely automatic heating and air conditioning system controlled by a dial thermostat on the instrument panel, was introduced as an industry first. The engine was bumped to 429 cu in (7 L), with 340 hp (250 kW) available. Performance gains from the new engine showed best in the lower range, at 20 to 50 mph (30 to 80 km/h) traffic driving speeds. A new technical feature was the Turbo-Hydramatic transmission, also used in the De Ville and the Sixty Special. Series 62, 75, and the Commercial Chassis continued with the old Hydra-Matic until 1965.

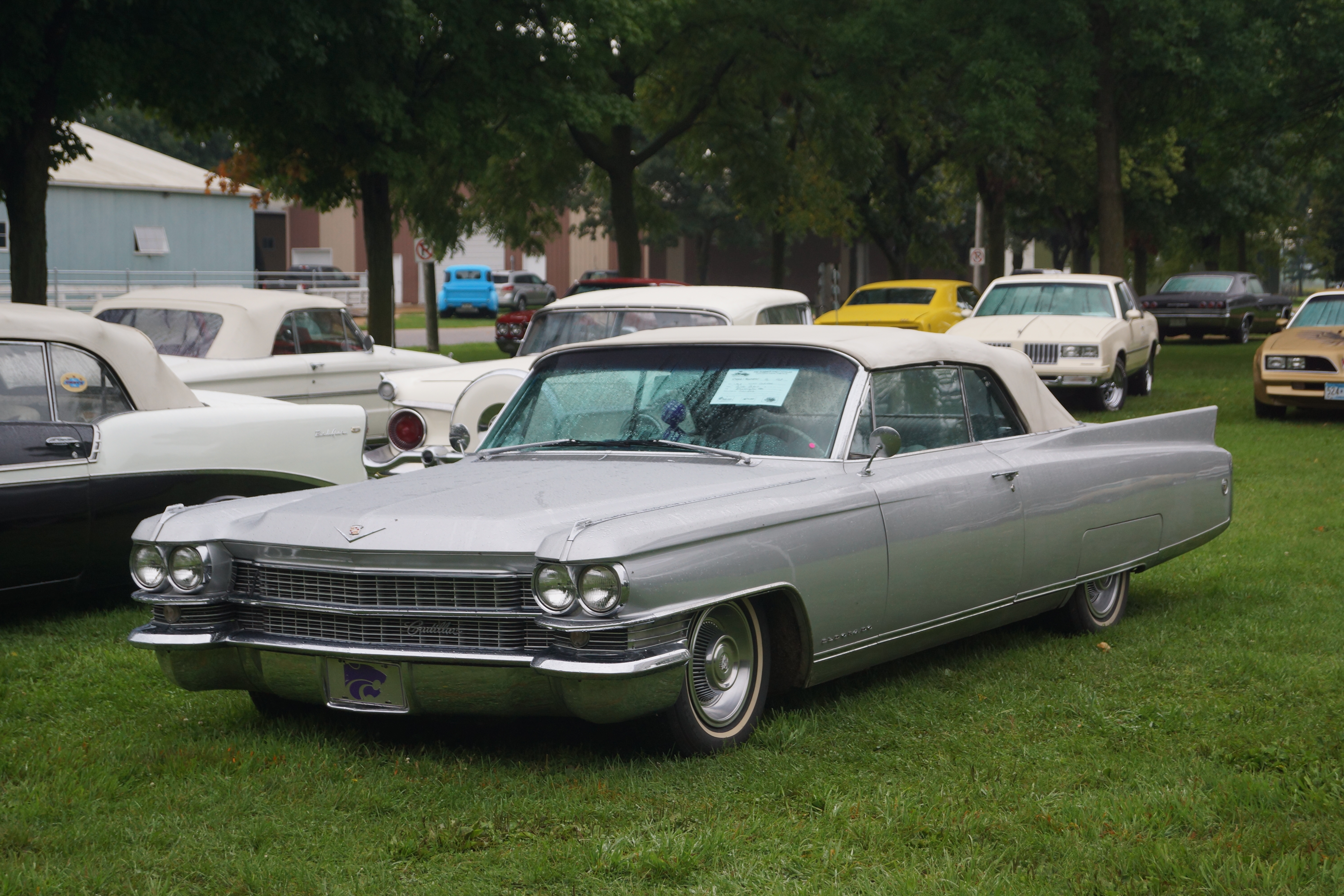
1963 Cadillac Eldorado Biarritz

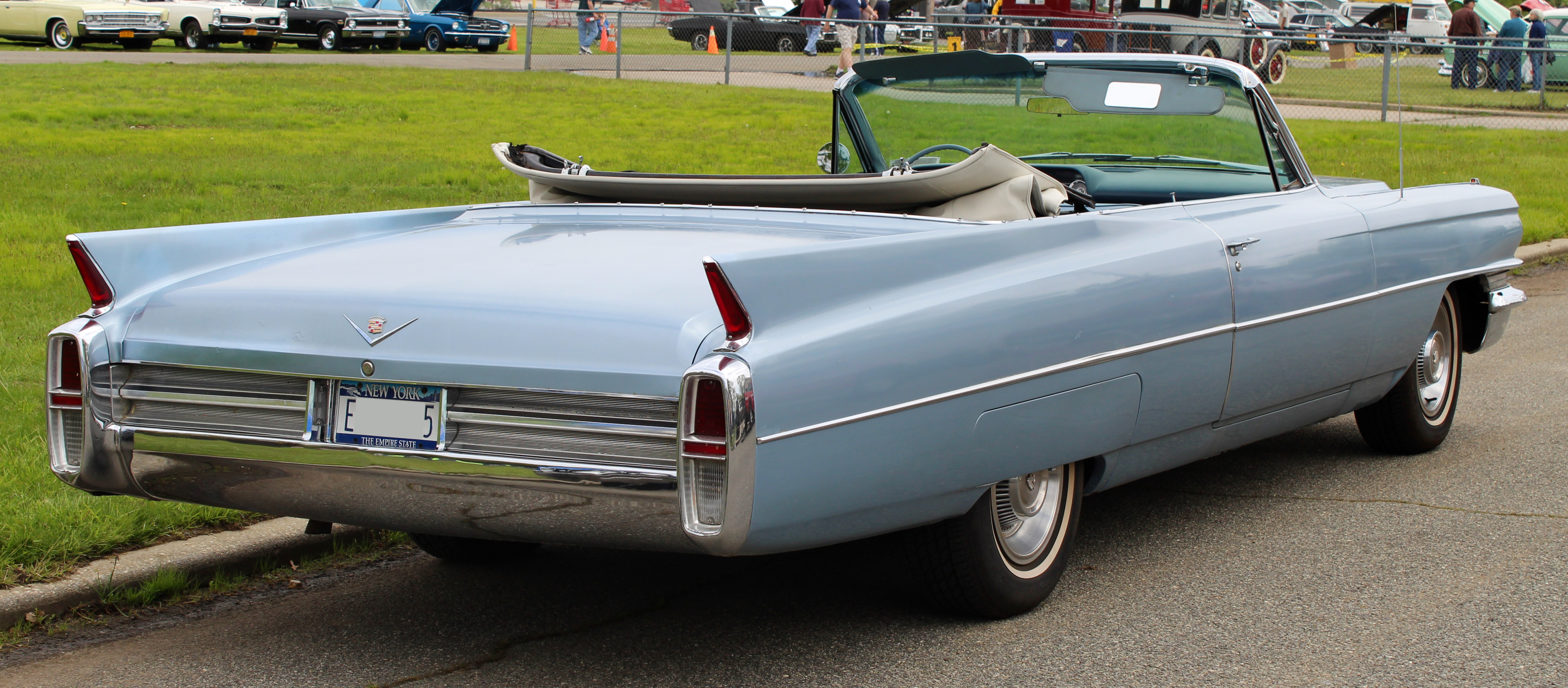
1963 Cadillac Eldorado (rear)

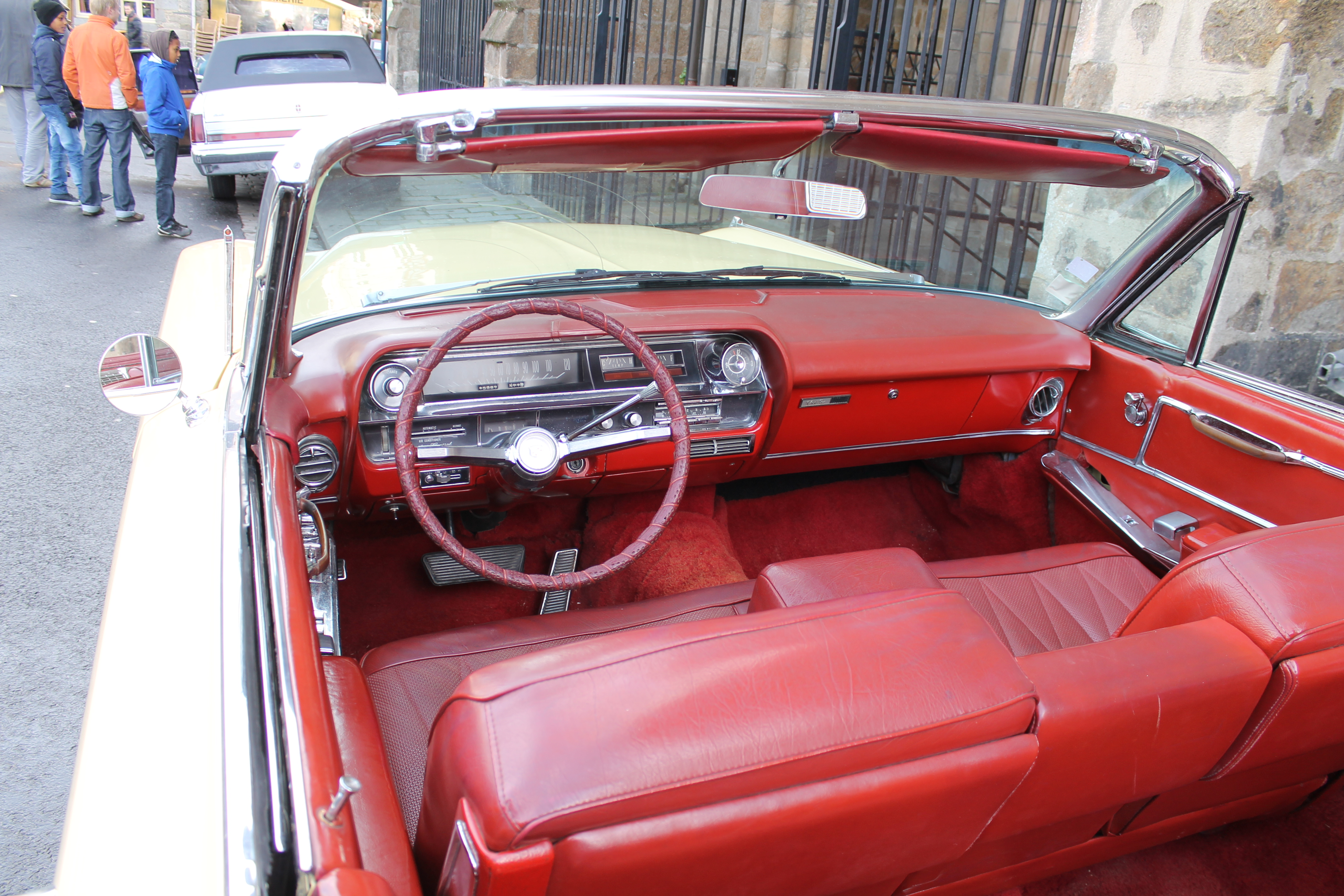
1964 Cadillac Eldorado interior

== Seventh generation (1965–1966) ==
Seventh generation
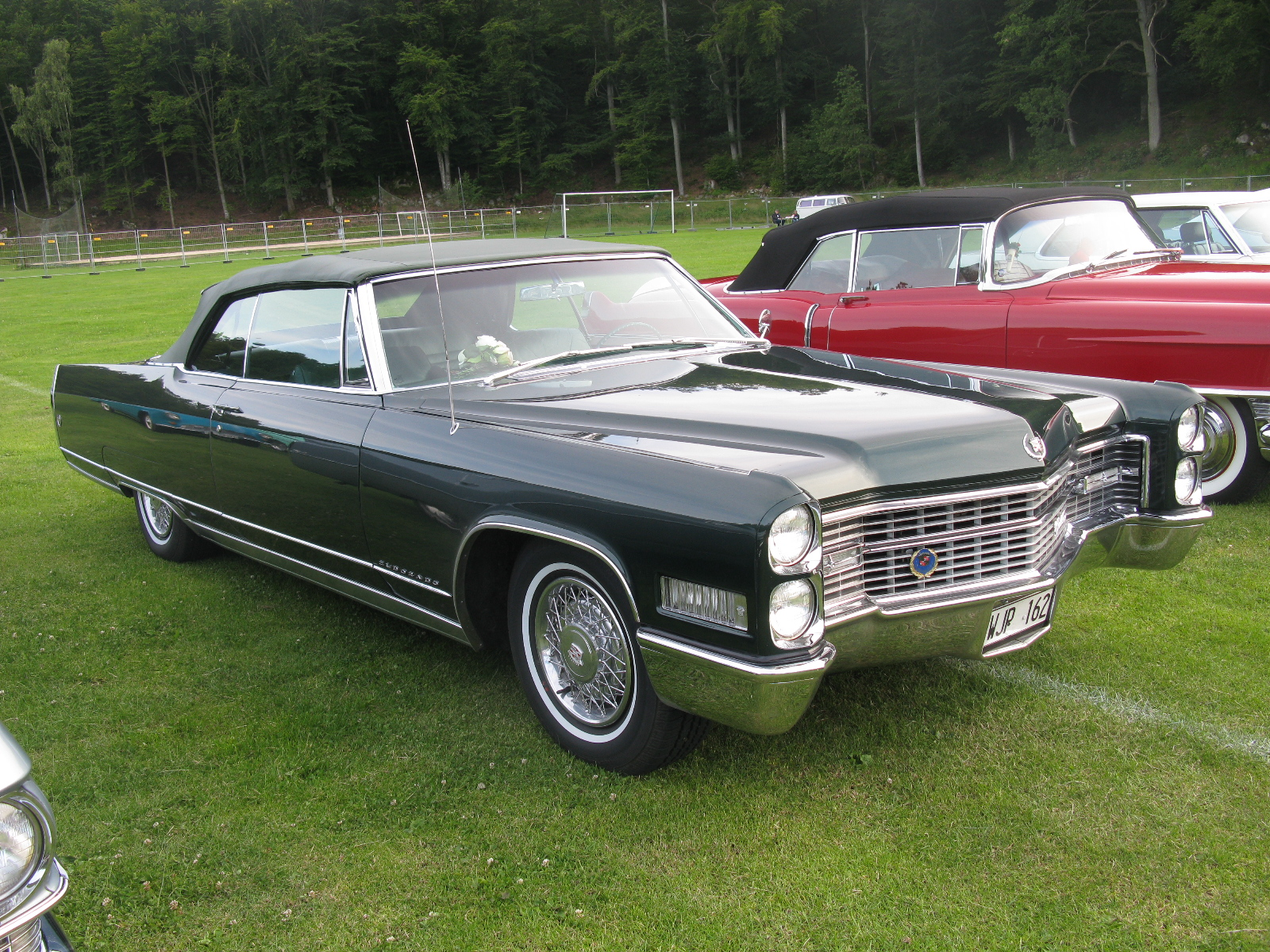
- 1966 Cadillac Eldorado

Overview
- Model years: 1965–1966
- Assembly: Detroit, Michigan, U.S.
- Designer: Bill Mitchell

Body and chassis
- Body style: 2-door convertible
- Layout: FR layout
- Platform: C-body
- Related: Cadillac De Ville; Cadillac Calais; Buick Electra; Oldsmobile 98

Powertrain
- Engine: 429 cu in (7.0 L) OHV V8
- Transmission: 3-speed Turbo-Hydramatic THM400 automatic

Dimensions
- Wheelbase: 129.5 in (3,289 mm)
- Length: 224.0 in (5,690 mm)
- Width: 79.9 in (2,029 mm)
- Curb weight: 4,700–4,900 lb (2,132–2,223 kg)

For 1965, the Eldorado gained Cadillac's Fleetwood designation, marketed as the Fleetwood Eldorado, in a similar fashion to the Fleetwood Series 75 and the Fleetwood Sixty Special. The Biarritz nomenclature was finally dropped from sales literature, probably because there was no need to distinguish the convertible from the long-defunct Eldorado Seville and Brougham (the Biarritz nameplate would be revived in 1976 as a trim option for the Eldorado coupe). This was the last generation of the Eldorado to be equipped with rear wheel drive.

The redesigned Eldorado still rode on the same 129.5 in (3,289 mm) wheelbase. The elevated tailfins became slightly downward-sloping, and sharp, distinct body lines replaced the rounded look. Also new were a straight rear bumper and vertical lamp clusters. The headlight pairs switched from horizontal to vertical, thus permitting a wider grille. Curved frameless side windows appeared with a tempered glass backlight. New standard features included lamps for luggage and glove compartments and front and rear safety belts. Power was still supplied by the 340 horsepower 429 cu in (7,030 cc) V8. Perimeter frame construction allowed repositioning the engine six inches forward in the frame, thus lowering the transmission hump and increasing interior room.

In 1966, changes included a somewhat coarser mesh for the radiator grille insert, which was now divided by a thick, bright metal horizontal center bar housing rectangular parking lamps at the outer ends. Separate rectangular side marker lamps replaced the integral grille extension designs. There was generally less chrome on all Cadillac models this year. Cadillac "firsts" this season included variable ratio power steering and optional front seats with carbon cloth heating pads built into the cushions and seatbacks. Comfort and convenience innovations were headrests, reclining seats and an AM/FM stereo system. Automatic level control was available. Engineering improvements made to the perimeter frame increased ride and handling ease. Newly designed piston and oil rings and a new engine mounting system and patented quiet exhaust were used.

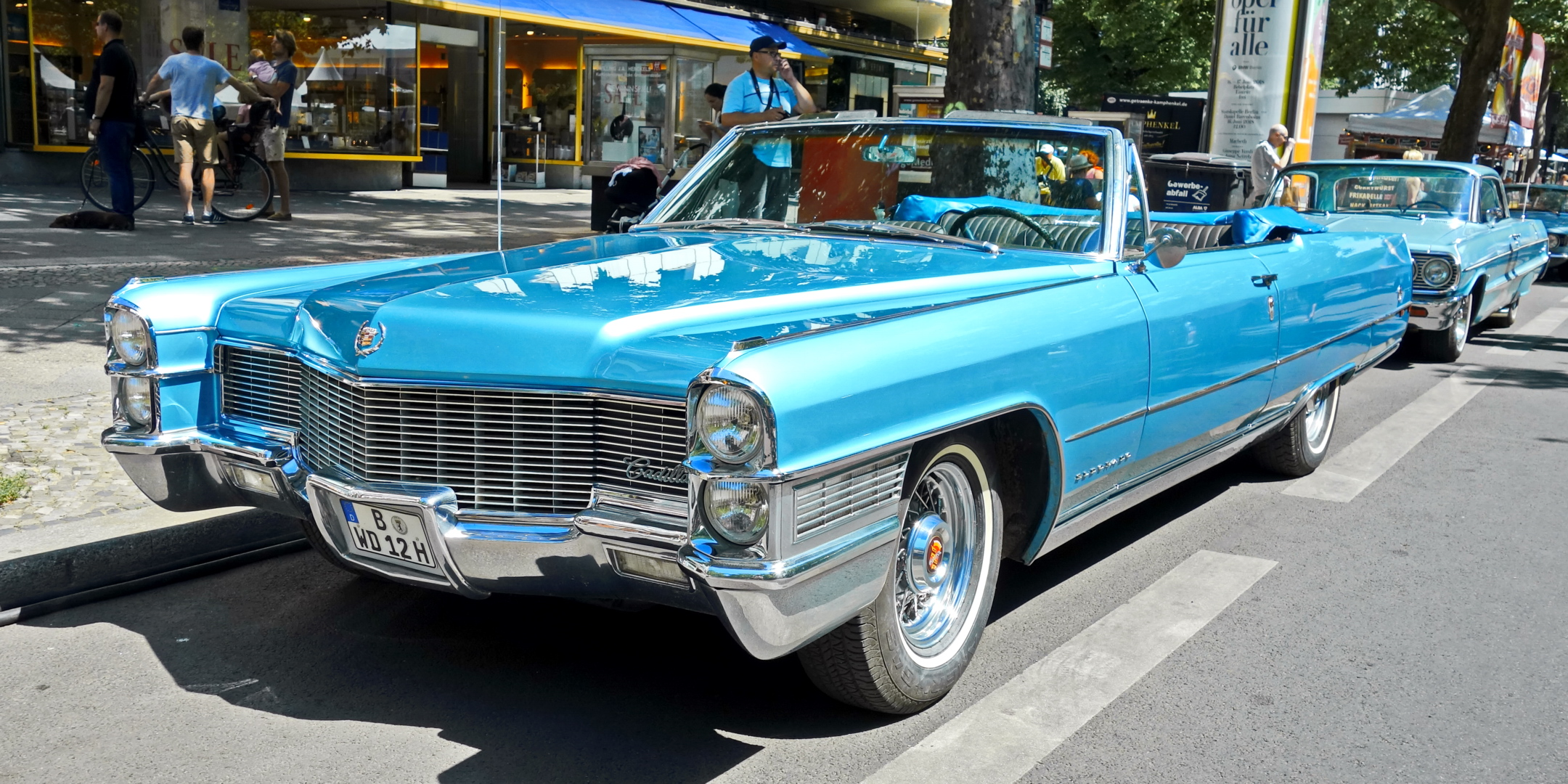
1965 Cadillac Eldorado

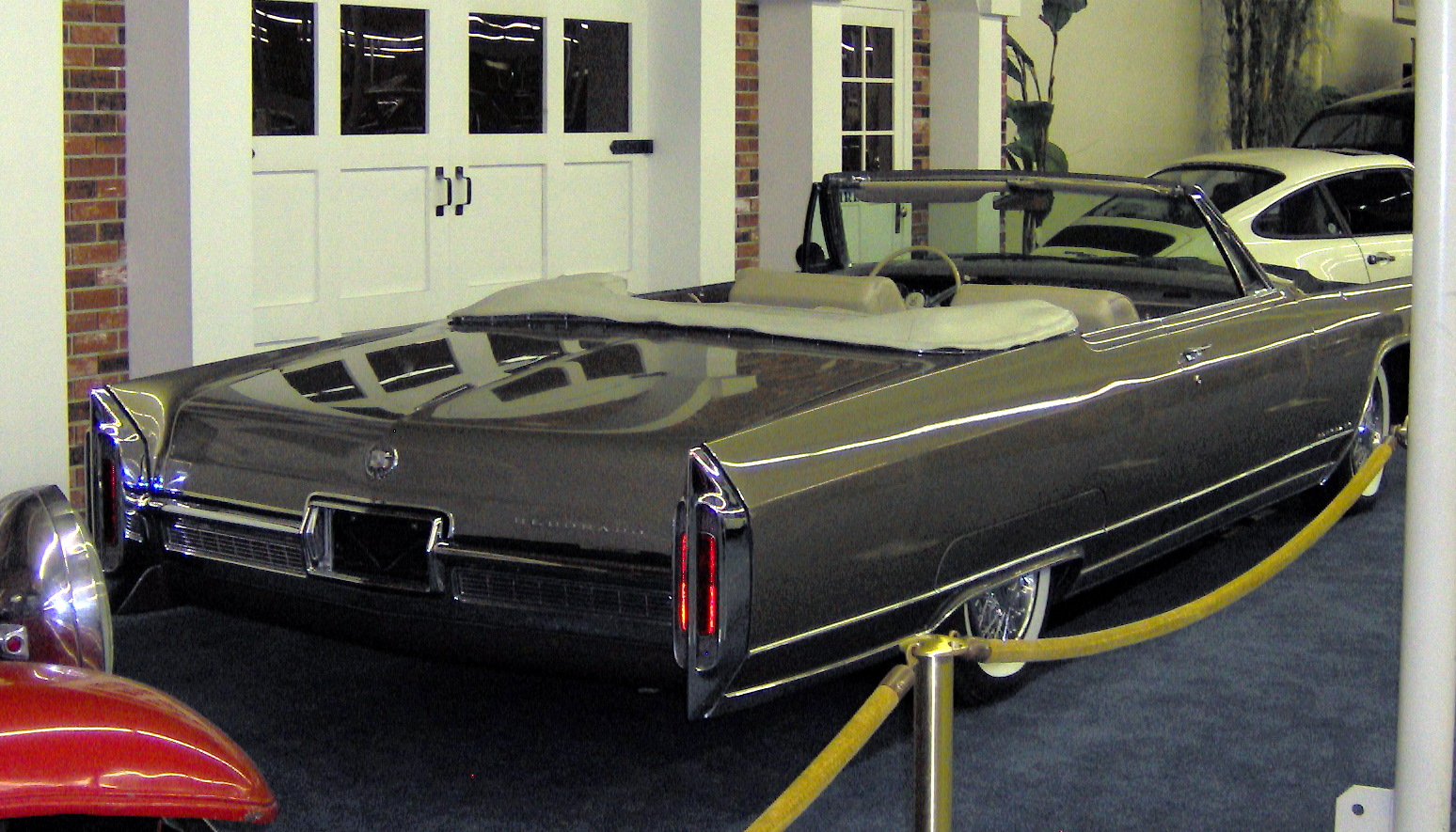
1966 Cadillac Eldorado

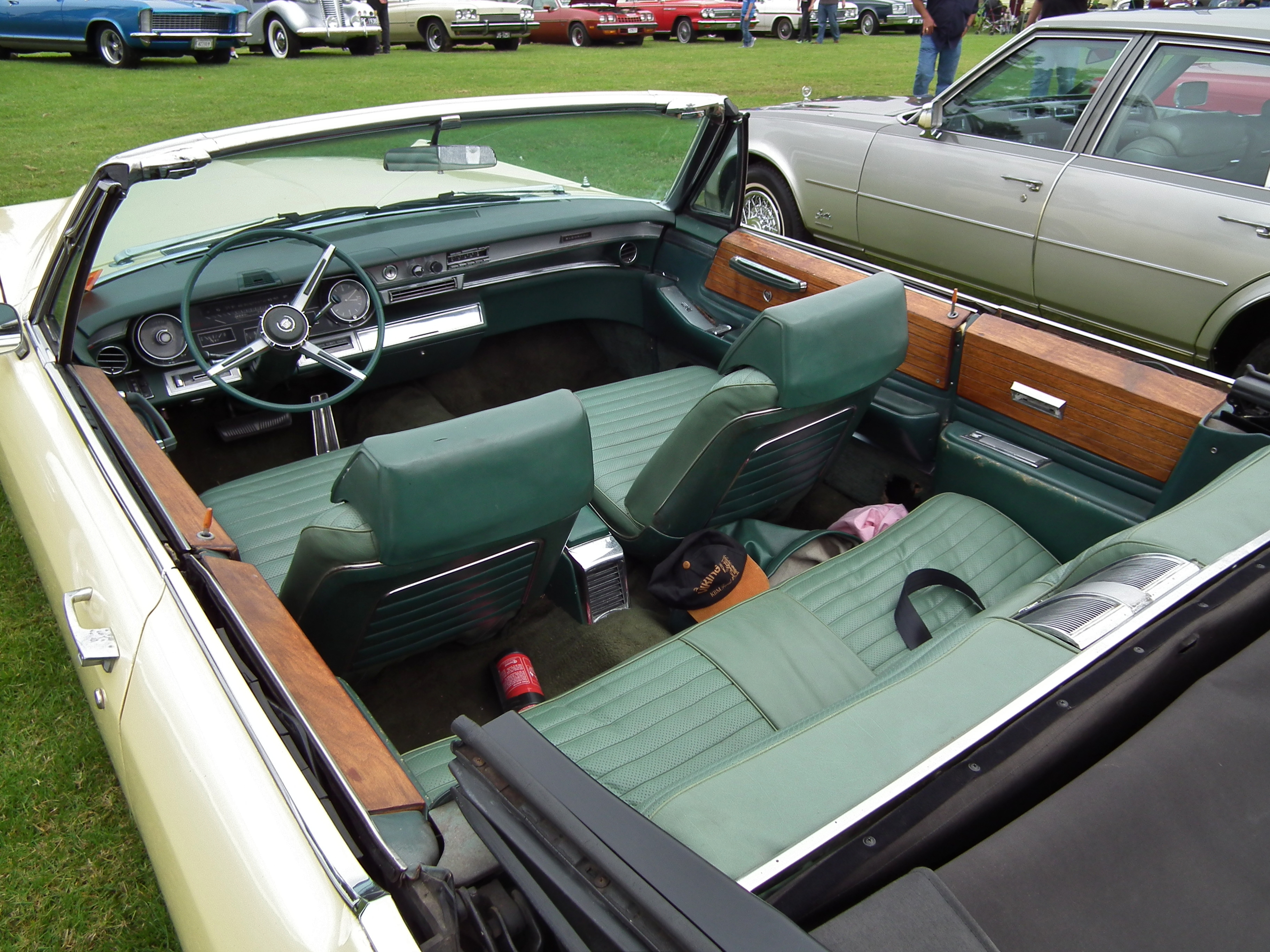
1966 Cadillac Eldorado interior

== Eighth generation (1967–1970) ==
Eighth generation
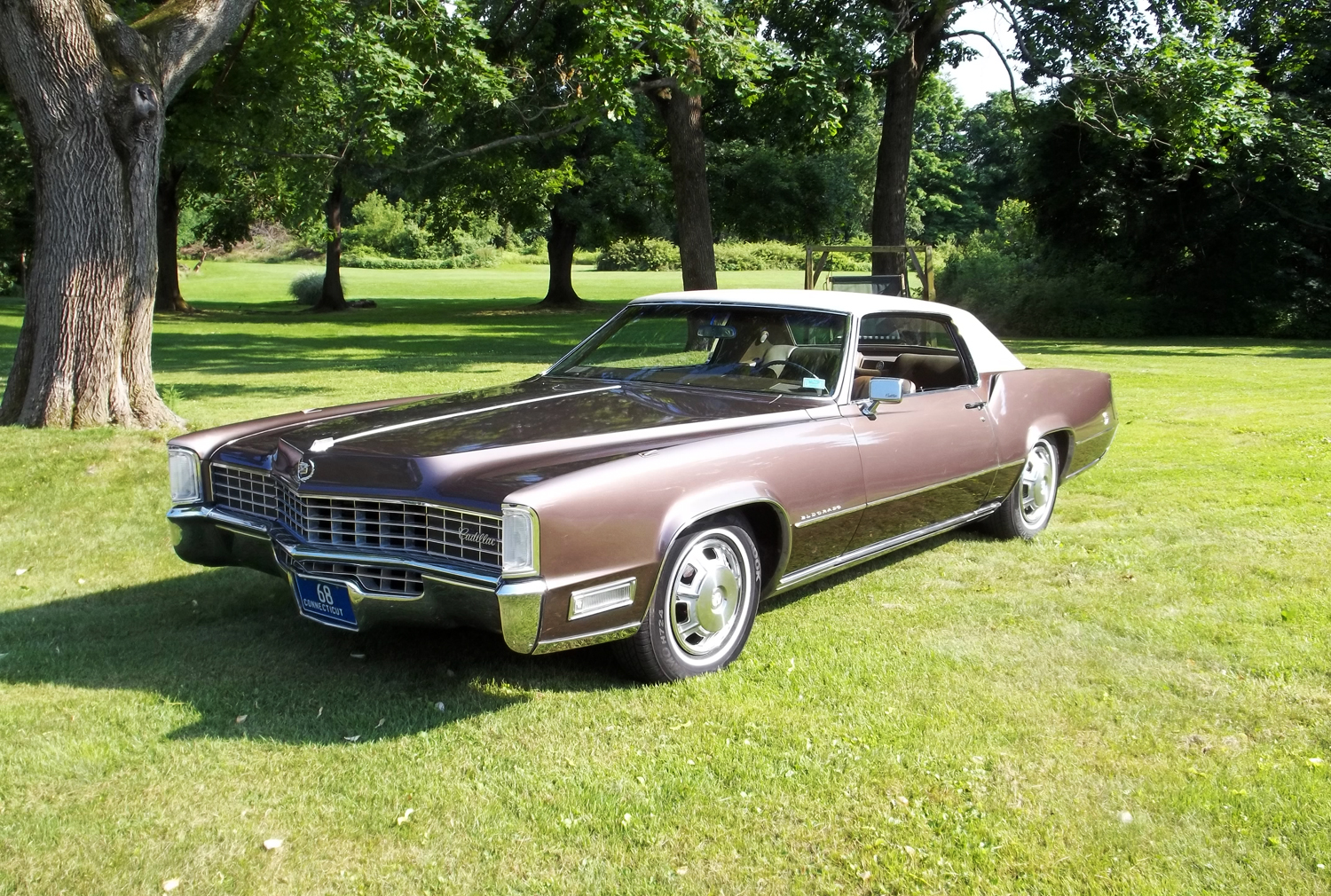
- 1968 Eldorado

Overview
- Production: 1967–1970
- Assembly: Detroit, Michigan, U.S.
- Designer: Bill Mitchell

Body and chassis
- Body style: 2-door hardtop
- Layout: Longitudinal front-engine, front-wheel drive
- Platform: E-body
- Related: Buick Riviera; Oldsmobile Toronado

Powertrain
- Engine: 429 cu in (7.03 L) OHV V8 (1967 only); 472 cu in (7.7 L) V8 (introduced 1968); 500 cu in (8.2 L) V8 (introduced 1970)
- Transmission: 3-speed automatic

Dimensions
- Wheelbase: 120.0 in (3,048 mm)
- Length: 221.0 in (5,613 mm)
- Width: 79.9 in (2,029 mm)
- Curb weight: 4,696 lb (2,130 kg)

The Eldorado was radically redesigned for 1967 as a front-wheel drive hardtop coupe, becoming Cadillac's entry in the era's burgeoning personal luxury car market. Promoted as a "personal" Cadillac, it shared the E-body with the second-generation Buick Riviera and the first-generation Oldsmobile Toronado, which had been introduced the previous year.

To enhance its distinctiveness, Cadillac adapted the Toronado's front-wheel drive unified powerplant package, mating a Cadillac 429 V8 to a Turbo-Hydramatic 425 automatic transmission. Front disc brakes were optional, and new standard safety equipment included an energy absorbing steering column and generously padded instrument panel.

The 1967 Eldorado was a great departure from previous generations, which shared styling with Cadillac's De Ville and Series 62. GM styling chief Bill Mitchell chose angular, crisp styling for the Eldorado, setting it apart from more streamlined Riviera and Toronado. The rear end design was inspired by the GM-X Stiletto concept car. It was the first and only Cadillac model with the headlamps concealed behind moveable covers; this feature was for two years only (1967 and 1968). Rear passenger windows retracted sideways into the C-pillar instead of down into the side body panel.

The Eldorado achieved 0-60 mph (0–97 km/h) acceleration in less than nine seconds, and a top speed of 120 mph (190 km/h). Roadability and neutral handling were highly praised by contemporary reviews, and sales were excellent despite high list prices. Its sales of 17,930 units, nearly three times the previous Eldorado high, helped give Cadillac its best year ever.

In 1968, the 429 V8 was replaced by the new 472 (7.7 L) V8 with SAE gross 375 hp (280 kW) and 525 lb⋅ft (712 N⋅m) of torque. Despite the larger and more powerful engine, acceleration did not improve due to the reduction in final drive ratio from 3.21 to 3.07. Fuel consumption was 10 mpg (23.5 l/100 km) city and 13 mpg (18 l/100 km) highway. The hood was extended 4.5 inches longer in the rear as to conceal the windshield wipers. The previously optional front disc brakes became standard. The bumper-mounted front turn signal indicators and parking lights were repositioned to the fenders, replacing the end caps. The red side running lamps without retroreflective markers were attached to the rear fenders. The external rear view mirrors were enlarged and became rectangle-shaped with fixed housing and moveable mirror. Sales set another record at 24,528, with Eldorado accounting for nearly 11% of all Cadillac models sold.

In 1969, the concealed headlamps were eliminated due to the new federal safety regulations stipulating that the headlamp covers must operate within a specific period of time when entering tunnels or darkened buildings (i.e. parking garages). Side impact protection beams were installed inside the doors. The dashboard and instrument cluster were redesigned: the dash cowl became more pronounced and contained all of the controls, driver's side vents, and instrument clusters. On the passenger side, the vents were moved to the single horizontal rosewood veneer panel. The instrument clusters had a thin wood veneer panel where the warning lights are located. For 1970, the wood veneer was expanded to cover most of the instrument clusters.

In 1970, the Eldorado featured the new Cadillac 500 V8 (8.2 L) V8 engine, putting out SAE gross 400 hp (298 kW) and 550 lb⋅ft (746 N⋅m). It was exclusive to the Eldorado until 1975, when it became the standard engine option for all Cadillac models except the Seville. The power sunroof by ASC and rear "Trackmaster" anti-lock braking system were offered as extra-cost options. Styling changes for 1970 included a new grille with scripted "Eldorado" and rectangular "8.2 LITRE" badges, and new taillamp bezels that eliminated the protruding "chrome fins". The side running lamps included retroreflective markers, amber in the front and red in the rear.

1967 Cadillac Eldorado

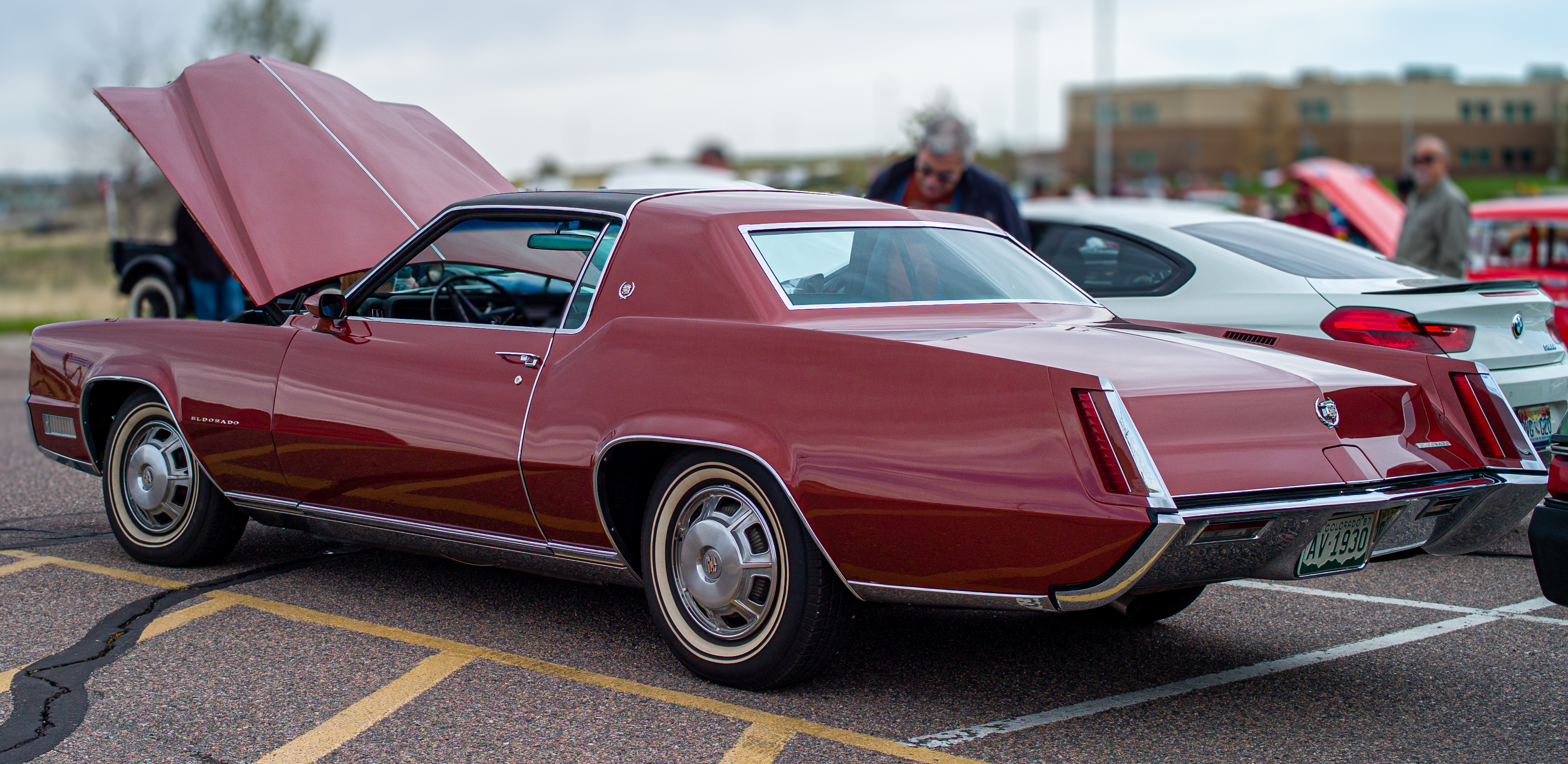
1967 Cadillac Eldorado

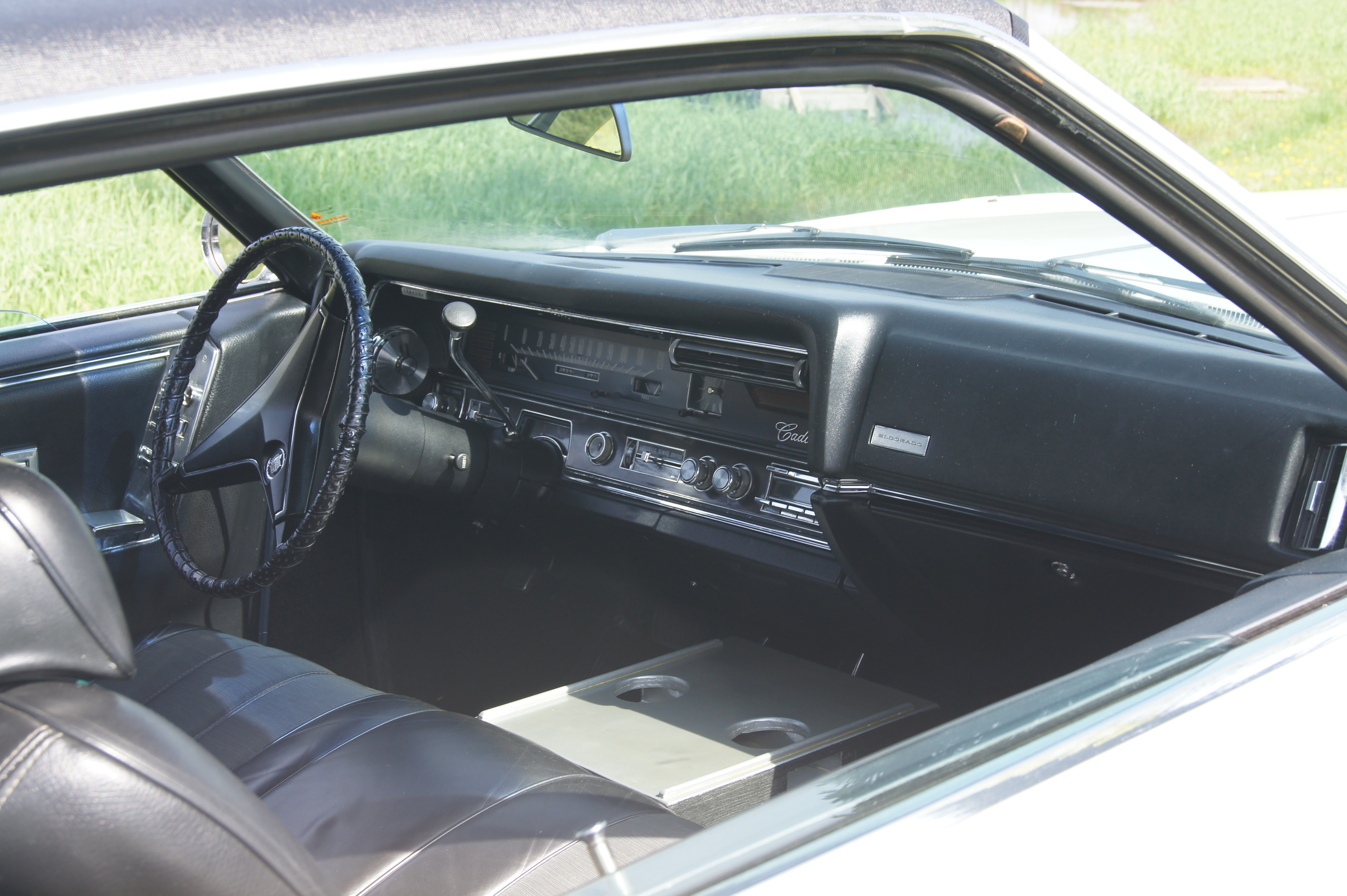
1967 Cadillac Eldorado interior

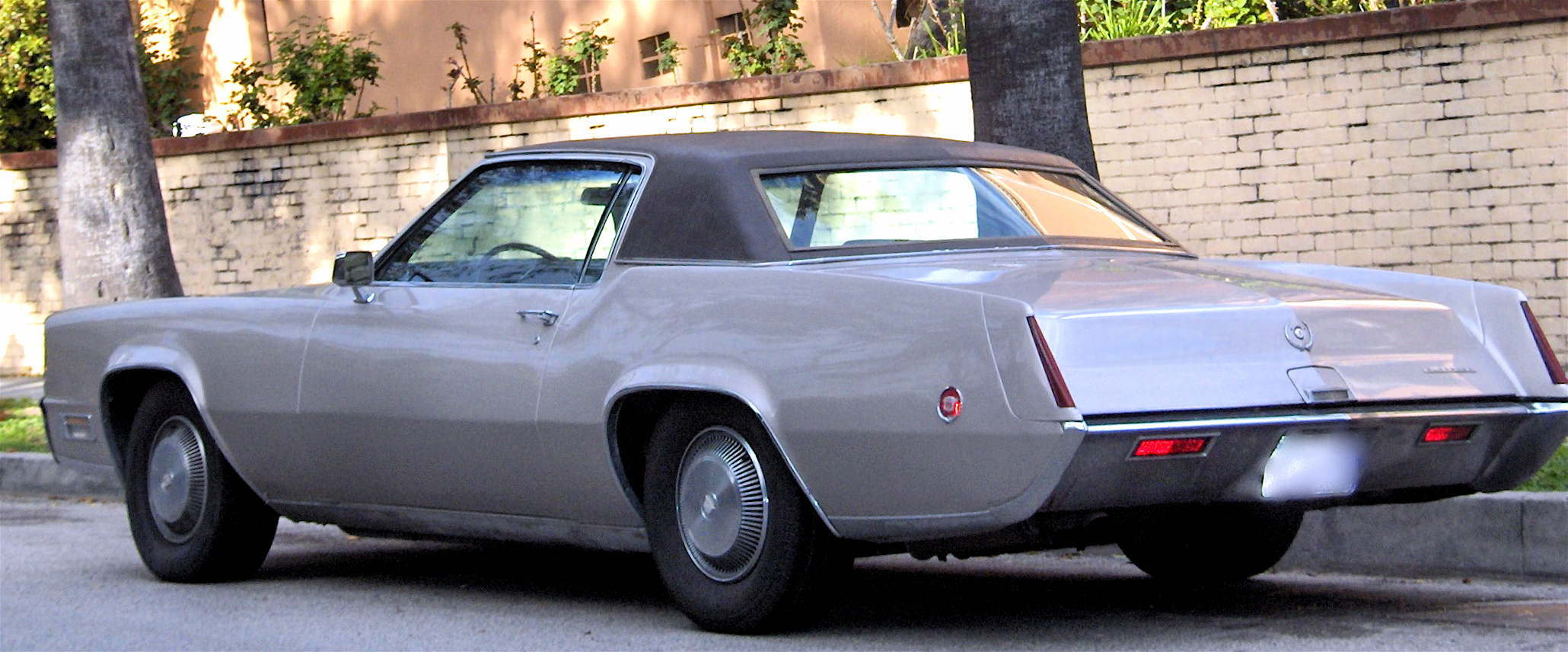
1970 Cadillac Eldorado (rear)

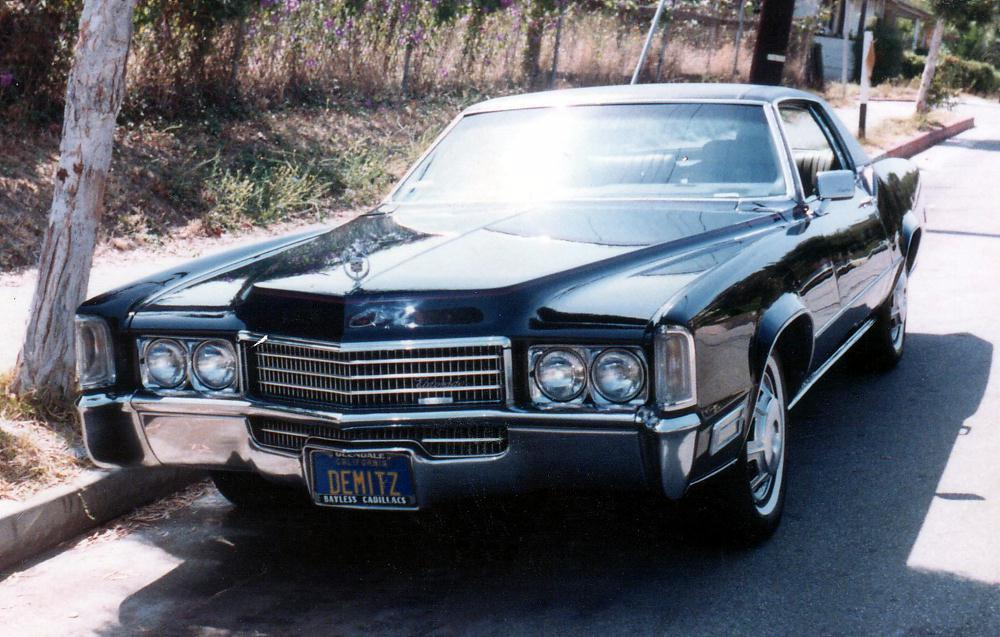
1970 Cadillac Eldorado (front)

== Ninth generation (1971–1978) ==
Ninth generation
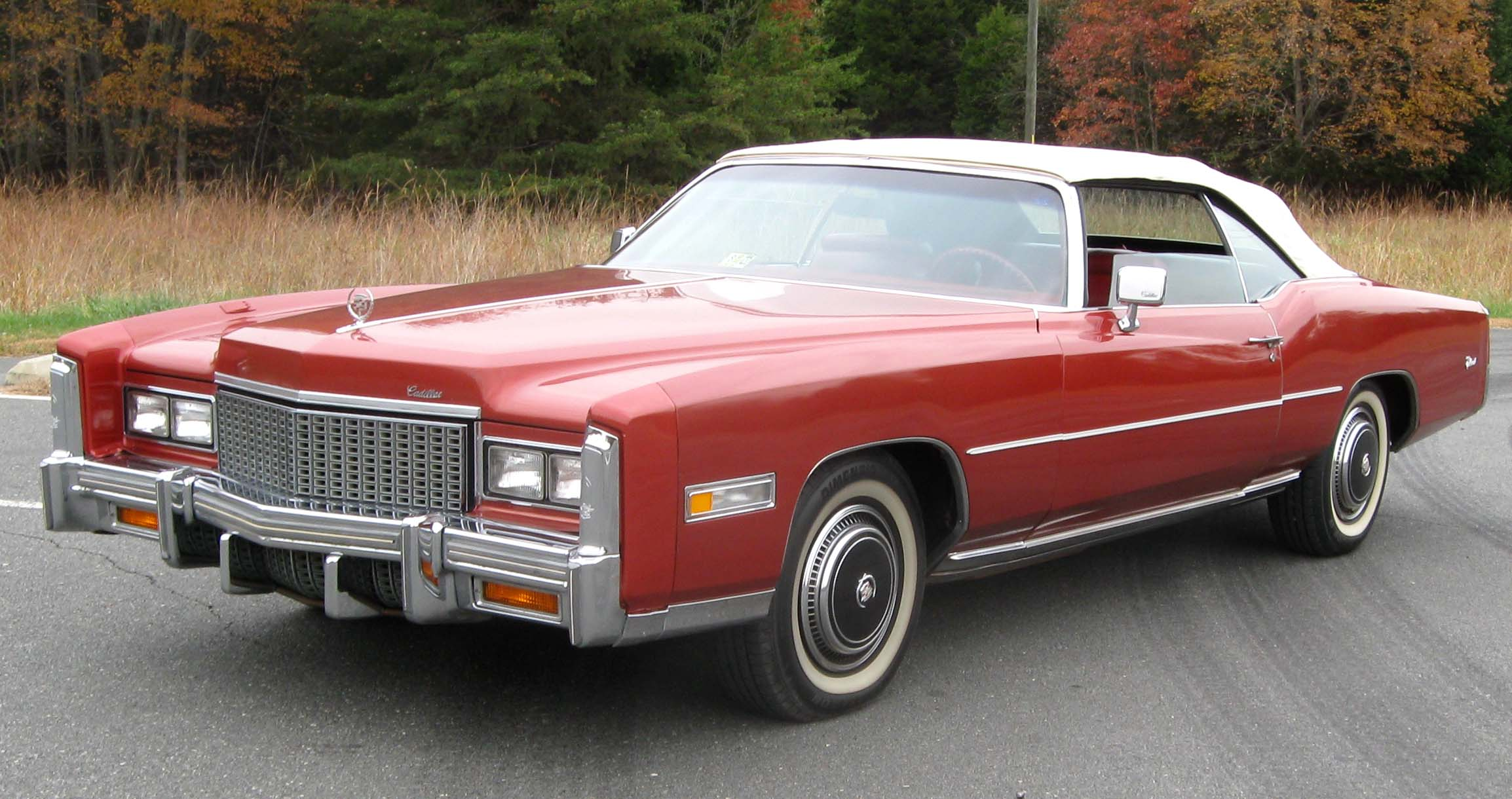
- 1976 Cadillac Eldorado convertible

Overview
- Production: 1971–1978
- Assembly: Detroit Assembly, Detroit, Michigan, U.S.

Body and chassis
- Body style: 2-door coupé 2-door convertible
- Layout: Longitudinal front-engine, front-wheel drive
- Platform: E-body
- Related: Buick Riviera; Oldsmobile Toronado

Powertrain
- Engine: 500 cu in (8.2 L) V8 (1971–76); 425 cu in (7.0 L) V8 (1977–78)
- Transmission: 3-speed automatic

Dimensions
- Wheelbase: 126.3 in (3,208 mm)
- Length: 224 in (5,690 mm) (1977–78); 224.1 in (5,692 mm) (1974–76); 223 in (5,664 mm) (1971–73)
- Width: 79.8 in (2,027 mm)
- Height: 54.2 in (1,377 mm)
- Curb weight: 4,828 lb (2,190 kg)

The ninth generation Eldorado, introduced for 1971, was substantially redesigned, growing two inches in length, six in wheelbase and featuring standard fender skirts, all of which gave the car a much heavier appearance than the previous generation. The 500 cu in (8.2 L) V8 engine remained an Eldorado exclusive. This 126.3 in (3,208 mm) wheelbase Eldorado would run through 1978, with major facelifts for 1973, 1974, and 1975. A record 27,368 Eldorados were sold during the 1971 model year.

An Eldorado convertible was also offered for 1971, the first in the line since 1966. Door glass remained frameless, and the hardtop rear quarter windows were deleted, replaced by a fixed "opera window" in the widened "C" pillar. A stand-up wreath and crest hood ornament was new this year.

Inside, there was a redesigned instrument panel and new seat configurations. A fiber-optic "lamp monitor" system, which displayed the functionality of the headlamps, taillamps, parking lamps, turn signals and brakelights was mounted on each front fender and the shelf below the rear window.

Changes were minimal for 1972, the most noticeable exterior change was a new 'Eldorado' script, replacing the block 'Eldorado' lettering on the front fenders and trunk lid. Sales for 1972 increased to 40,074.

In 1973, the Eldorado was removed from the Fleetwood series and reestablished as its own series. The 1973 models received a major facelift, featuring a massive eggcrate grille, new front and rear bumpers, decklid, rear fenders and taillamps. Interiors featured new "soft pillow" door panels, with larger, sturdier pull-straps. The rear "lamp monitor" display which showed the driver the function of the turn signal, brake and taillamps, was relocated (except on the convertible) from the rear shelf, to the headliner just above the rear window.

The Cadillac Eldorado was chosen as the official pace car for the Indianapolis 500 in 1973. Cadillac produced 566 of these special pace car convertibles. Thirty-three were used at the track during the race week, with the remainder distributed to U.S. Cadillac dealers, with one per dealership. Sales of the Eldorado coupe and convertible soared to 51,451, the highest total for the model during the 1970s and over a sixth of all Cadillac sales for 1973.

The lengthened wheelbase reduced performance relative to contemporary premium personal luxury cars, but offered comfortable seating for six adults rather than just four.

For 1974, the Eldorado featured a redesigned rear bumper with vertical chrome fender extensions, housing rear reflector/sidemarker lamps. This new bumper was designed to meet the new 5 mile impact federal design regulation. Other styling changes included new horizontal taillamps and backup lights placed beneath the trunk lid, a new fine mesh grille with Cadillac script on the header and new standard wheel covers. Inside, there was a redesigned two-tier, curved instrument panel, marketed in sales literature as "space age" and shared with all 1974 Cadillacs. A new quartz-controlled digital clock, an "information band" of warning lights, and the fuel gauge ran horizontally along the upper tier of this new instrument panel.

Electronic fuel injection was a new option for 1975. The Eldorado received another facelift, with new rectangular headlamps, egg-crate grille, front bumper, full rear wheel openings sans fender skirts and sharper, angular lines resulting in a sleeker appearance, more reminiscent of the 1967–70 models. Along with the regular sunroof, a tinted Astroroof with sliding sunshade was another newly available option for 1975.

After years of diminishing sales, Cadillac announced that 1976 would be the final year for the Eldorado convertible, which was heavily promoted by General Motors as "the last American convertible". Some 14,000 would be sold, with many customers purchasing multiple cars as investments. The final 200 convertibles were designated as "Bicentennial Edition" commemorating America's 200th birthday. All 200 of these cars were identical, painted white with a dual red/blue pinstripe along the upper bodyside and inside, a commemorative plaque was mounted on the dashboard. When Cadillac reintroduced the Eldorado convertible for the 1984 model year, several customers who had purchased 1976 Eldorado convertibles as investments, felt they had been deceived and launched an unsuccessful class action lawsuit against General Motors.

Having received a major facelift the previous year, the 1976 Eldorado received only minor styling changes, including a new grille, a small Cadillac script on the hood face, revised taillamp lenses and new black painted wheel covers.

For 1977, the Eldorado again received a new grille with a finer crosshatch pattern. New vertical taillamps were relocated from below the trunk lid to the chrome bumper-fender extensions. New "Eldorado" block lettering appeared on the hood face, and new rectangular side marker lights with similar block lettering replaced the "Eldorado" script on the rear fenders. Inside, there was a new, two-spoke steering wheel with rectangular horn pad. The convertible was dropped (although Custom Coach of Lima, Ohio converted a few 1977 and 1978 Eldorados into convertibles using salvaged parts from earlier models). The mammoth 500 cu in. (8.2L) V8 of 1970–76 was replaced by a new 425 cu in. (7L) V8 with 180 bhp (134 kW) available in all 1977 Cadillacs, except the Seville.

A new grille was the only obvious change for 1978; the Eldorado would be completely redesigned and downsized for 1979.

Performance against competitors (1972)
| Make & model | Horsepower 'SAE net' | Top speed | Acceleration 0 to 60 mph (0–97 km/h) | Fuel economy |
|---|---|---|---|---|
| Cadillac Eldorado | 238 PS (175.0 kW; 234.7 bhp) | 189 km/h (117 mph) | 9.7 sec | 4 km/L (11 mpg_{‑imp}; 9.4 mpg_{‑US}) |
| Continental Mark IV | 215 PS (158.1 kW; 212.1 bhp) | 190 km/h (118 mph) | 10.8 sec | 4.8 km/L (14 mpg_{‑imp}; 11 mpg_{‑US}) |
| Oldsmobile Toronado | 269 PS (197.8 kW; 265.3 bhp) | 206 km/h (128 mph) | 10 sec | 4.2 km/L (12 mpg_{‑imp}; 9.9 mpg_{‑US}) |
| Buick Riviera | 253 PS (186.1 kW; 249.5 bhp) | 202 km/h (126 mph) | 8.9 sec | 4.1 km/L (12 mpg_{‑imp}; 9.6 mpg_{‑US}) |
| Imperial LeBaron coupe | 228 PS (167.7 kW; 224.9 bhp) | 191 km/h (119 mph) | 10.4 sec | 4.1 km/L (12 mpg_{‑imp}; 9.6 mpg_{‑US}) |
| Rolls-Royce Corniche | 240 PS (176.5 kW; 236.7 bhp) | 190 km/h (118 mph) | 9.7 sec | 5.1 km/L (14 mpg_{‑imp}; 12 mpg_{‑US}) |
| Jaguar XKE Series III V12 | 254 PS (186.8 kW; 250.5 bhp) | 217 km/h (135 mph) | 6.8 sec | 5.5 km/L (16 mpg_{‑imp}; 13 mpg_{‑US}) |
| Citroën SM | 170 PS (125.0 kW; 167.7 bhp) | 220 km/h (137 mph) | 8.5 sec | 8 km/L (23 mpg_{‑imp}; 19 mpg_{‑US}) |
| Mercedes-Benz 450 SLC | 192 PS (141.2 kW; 189.4 bhp) | 202 km/h (126 mph) | 9.5 sec | 6.5 km/L (18 mpg_{‑imp}; 15 mpg_{‑US}) |
| Jensen Interceptor | 254 PS (186.8 kW; 250.5 bhp) | 217 km/h (135 mph) | 7.5 sec | 4.4 km/L (12 mpg_{‑imp}; 10 mpg_{‑US}) |
| BMW 3.0CS | 180 PS (132.4 kW; 177.5 bhp) | 200 km/h (124 mph) | 7.9 sec | 7.6 km/L (21 mpg_{‑imp}; 18 mpg_{‑US}) |
| Stutz Blackhawk | 432 PS (317.7 kW; 426.1 bhp) | 210 km/h (130 mph) | 8.4 sec | 3.3 km/L (9.3 mpg_{‑imp}; 7.8 mpg_{‑US}) |

=== Eldorado Biarritz ===
Unlike the Cadillac De Ville and Fleetwood Brougham, both of which were available with the opulent d'Elegance luxury trim package, Cadillac did not offer a similar option for the Eldorado until late in the 1976 model year with the introduction of the Biarritz (a name last used for the 1964 Eldorado convertible) package. The car featured unique exterior trim and the rear half of the cabriolet roof was covered with a heavily padded landau vinyl top accented with large "opera" lights. Wheel covers with centers matching the car's paint color were also featured. The 1977–1978 interior featured "pillowed"-style, "tufted" leather seating, while the 1976 interior did not. As with other Cadillac models, special order contrasting upholstery piping and exterior colors were available.

The 1978 Biarritz option packages consisted of the Eldorado Custom Biarritz ($1,865); with Astroroof ($2,946); with sunroof ($2,746) and Eldorado Custom Biarritz Classic ($2,466); with unique two-tone paint and Astroroof ($3,547); with sunroof ($3,347).

The Eldorado Custom Biarritz Classic was produced only for 1978; available only in two-tone Arizona beige/demitasse brown, exactly 2000 were built, consisting of 1,499 with no Astroroofs or no sunroofs; 475 with Astroroofs; 25 with sunroofs and one was produced with a unique power sliding T-top. Only nine of the latter are known to have been retrofitted by the American Sunroof Company under the direction of Cadillac.

The Biarritz package proved to be popular and was available on the Eldorado through the 1991 model year. In 1992, it was replaced with the touring coupe (ETC) option. Some of the original Biarritz styling cues vanished during the 1980s, such as the brushed stainless steel roof cap (1979–85) and the ultra-plush "pillowed" interior seating designs, but the Biarritz remained unique.

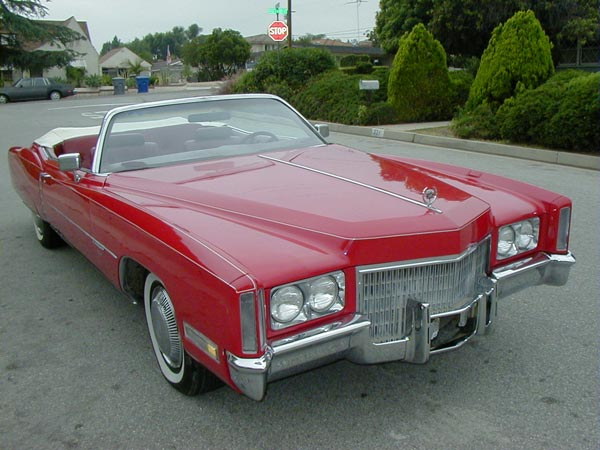
1971 Eldorado convertible

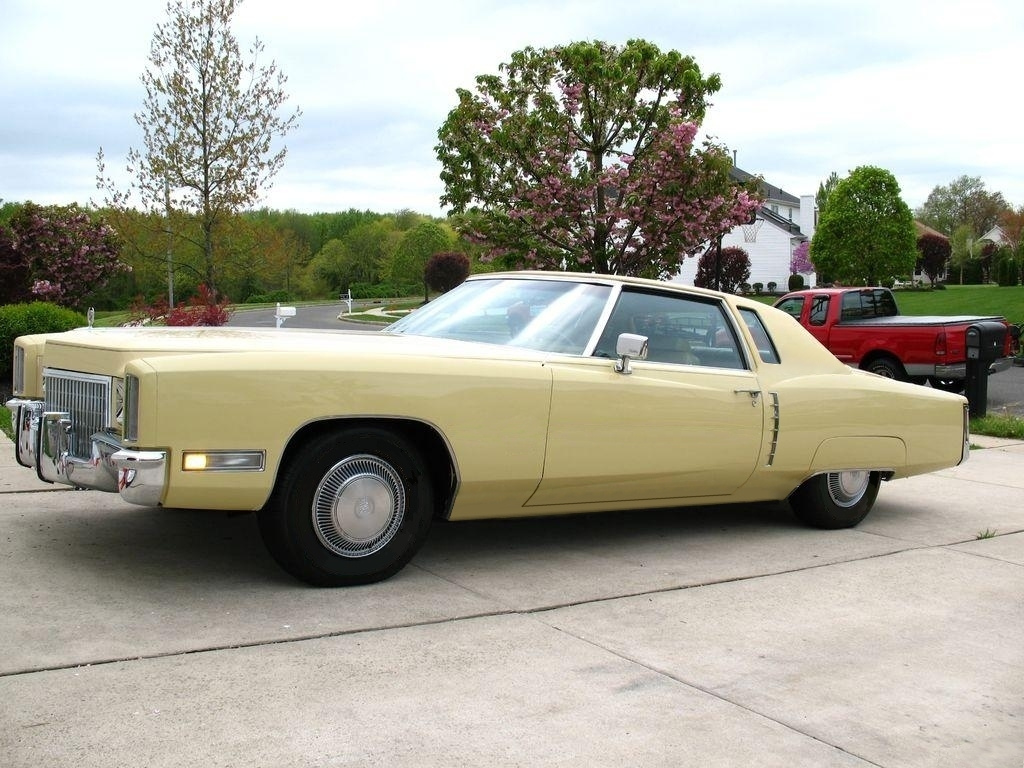
1971 Cadillac Fleetwood Eldorado Coupe

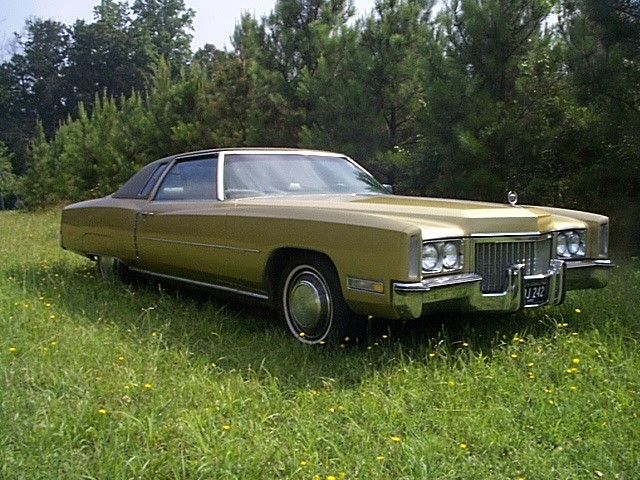
1972 Cadillac Fleetwood Eldorado Coupe

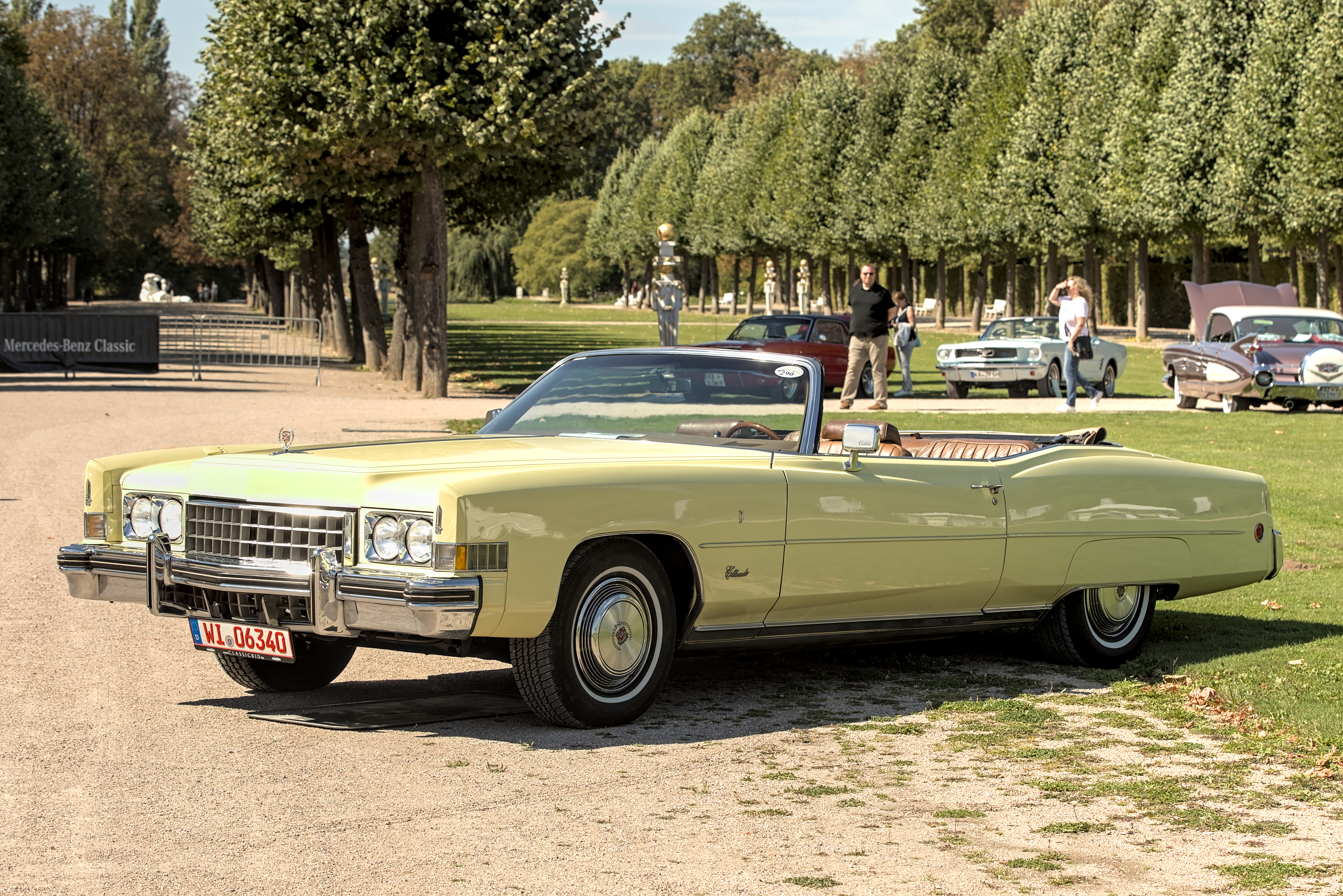
1973 Eldorado convertible

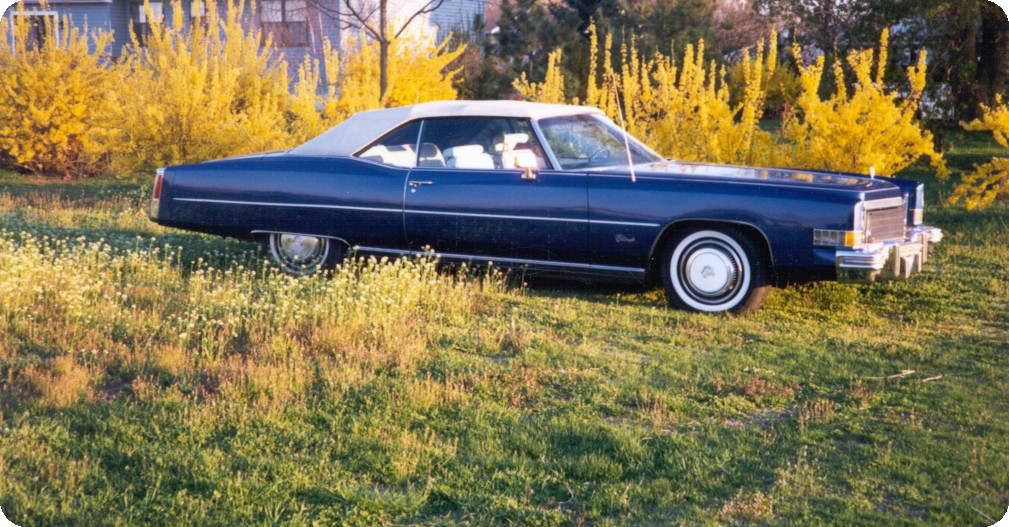
1974 Eldorado convertible

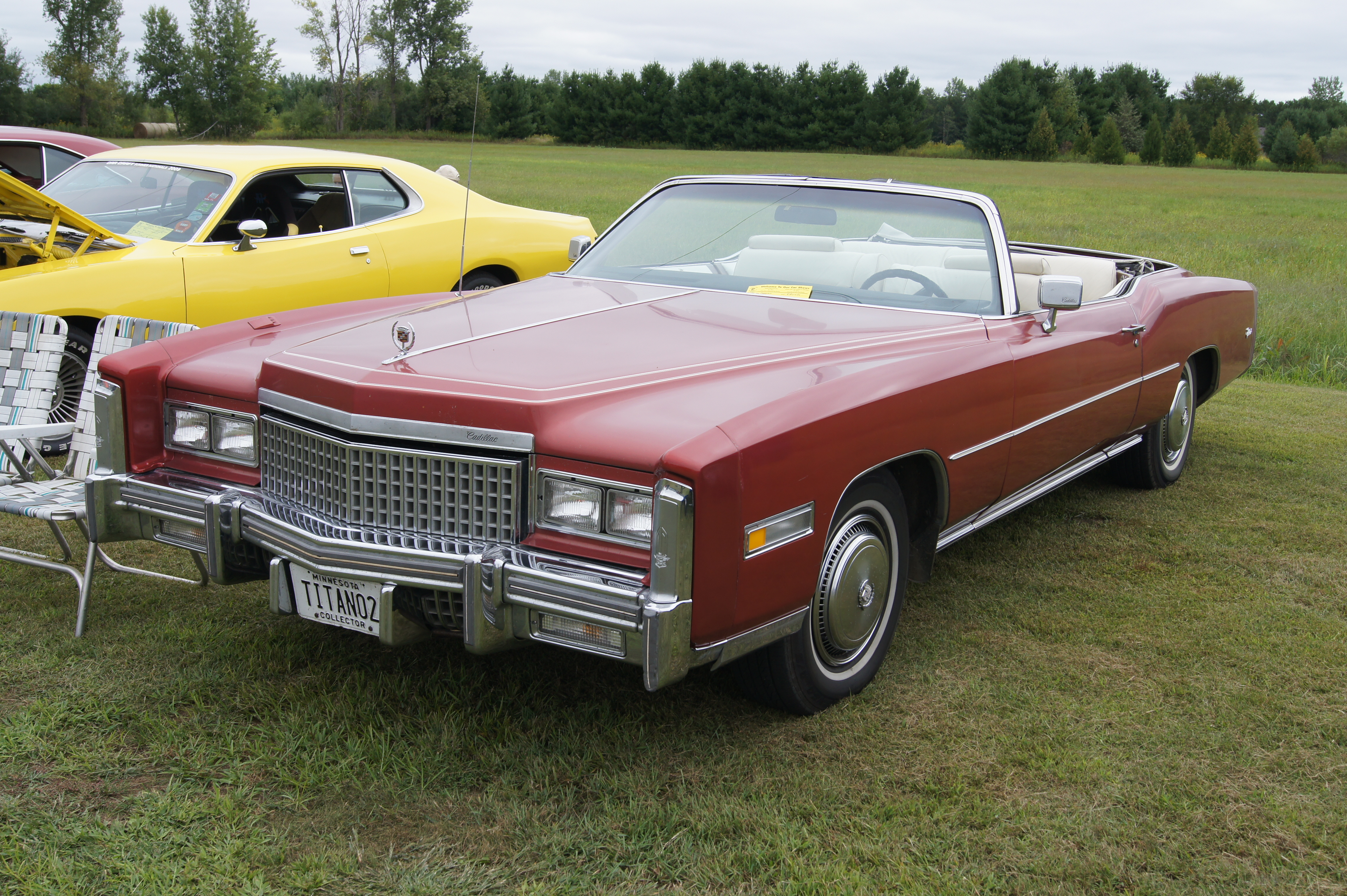
1975 Cadillac Eldorado convertible

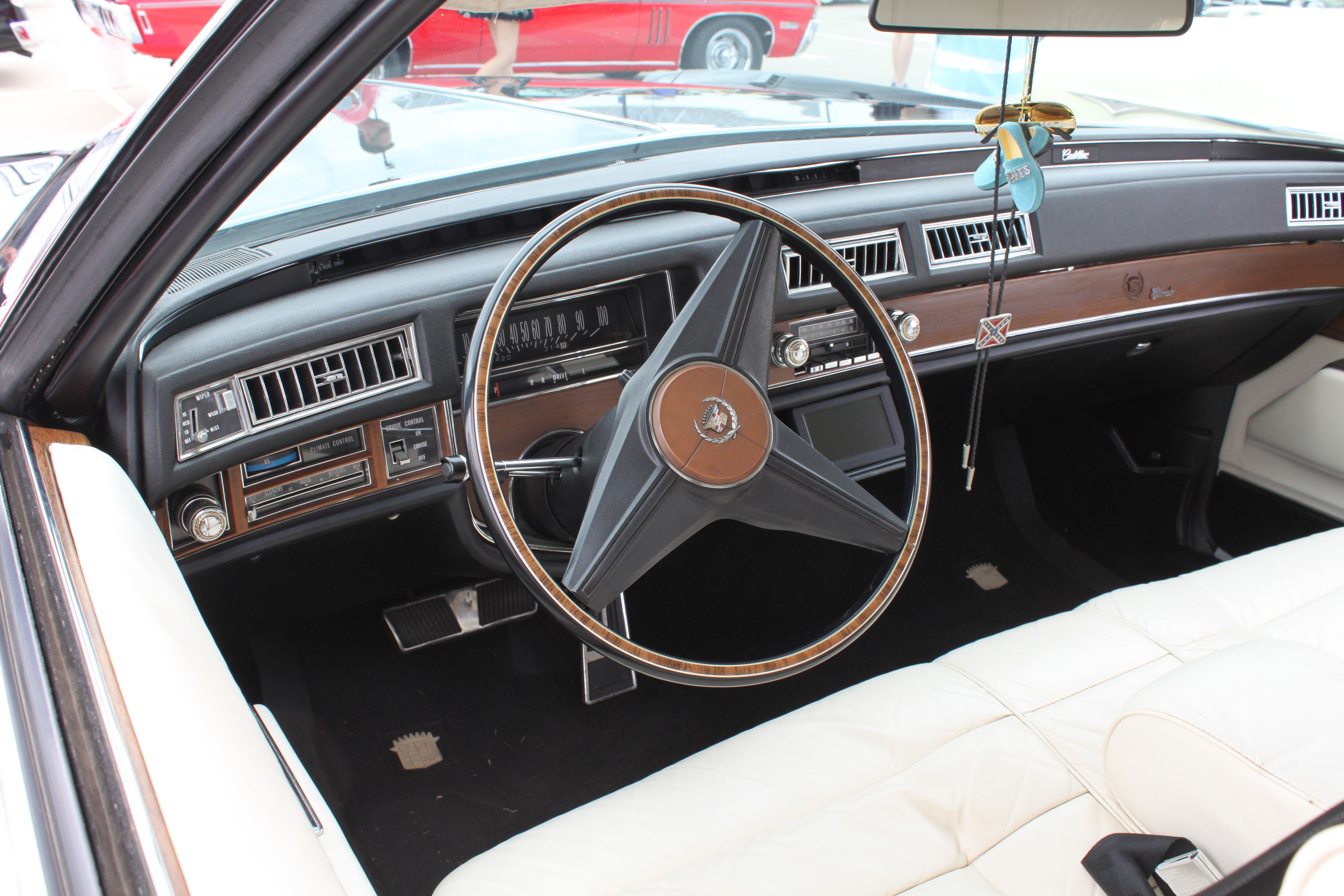
1975 Cadillac Eldorado coupe interior

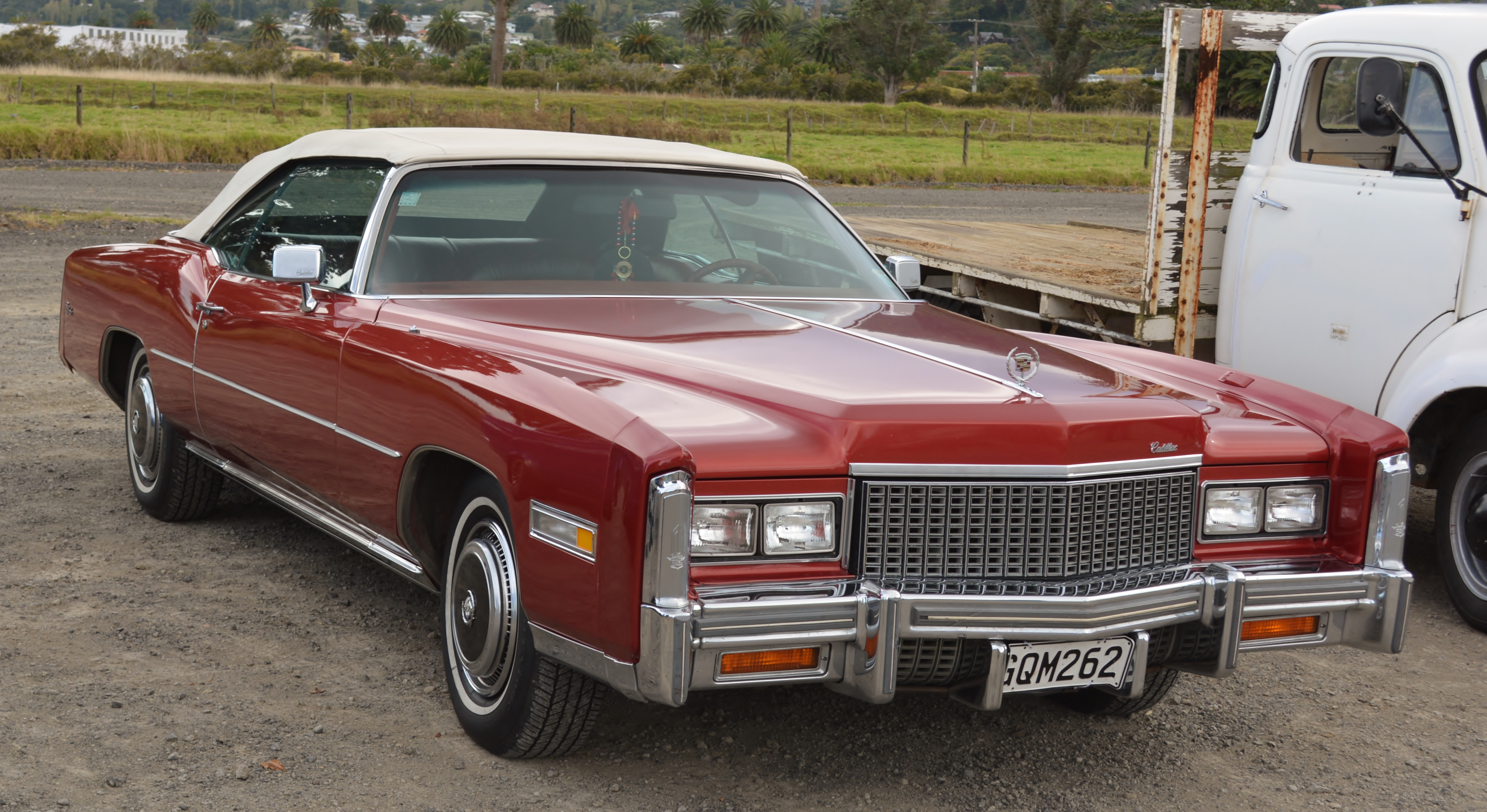
1976 Cadillac Eldorado Convertible

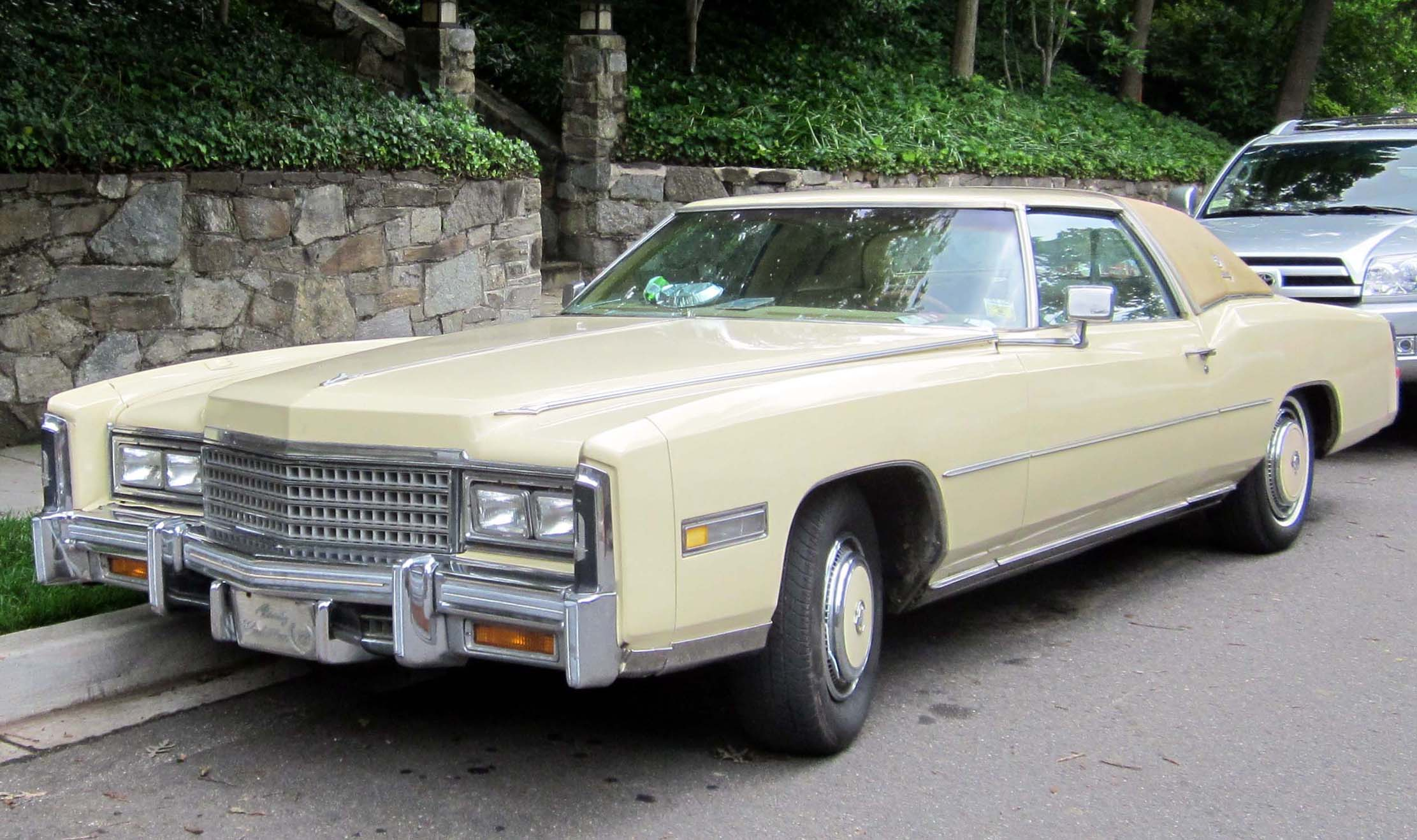
1978 Cadillac Eldorado coupe with custom vinyl top

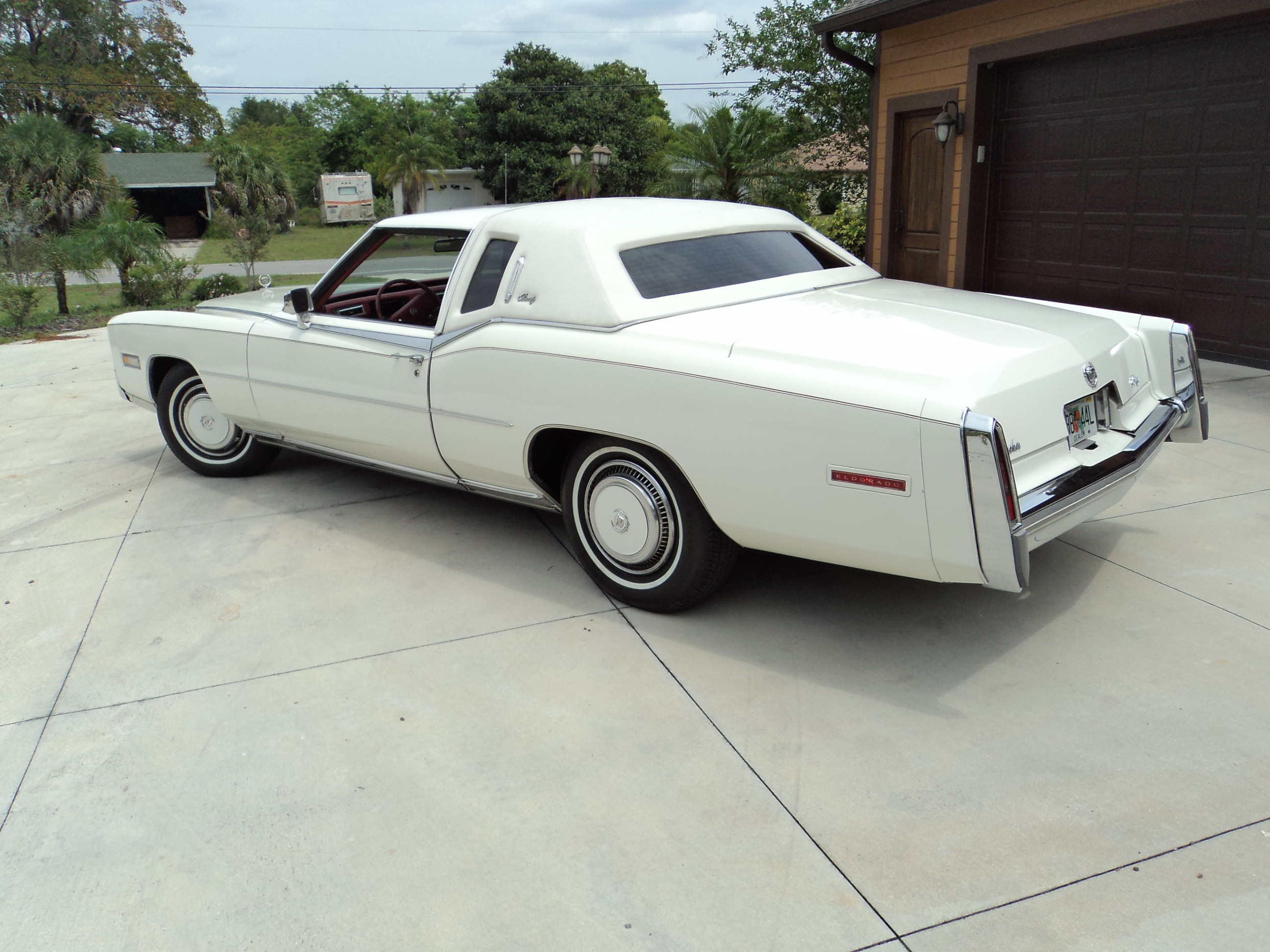
1978 Cadillac Eldorado Biarritz (rear)

== Tenth generation (1979–1985) ==
Tenth generation
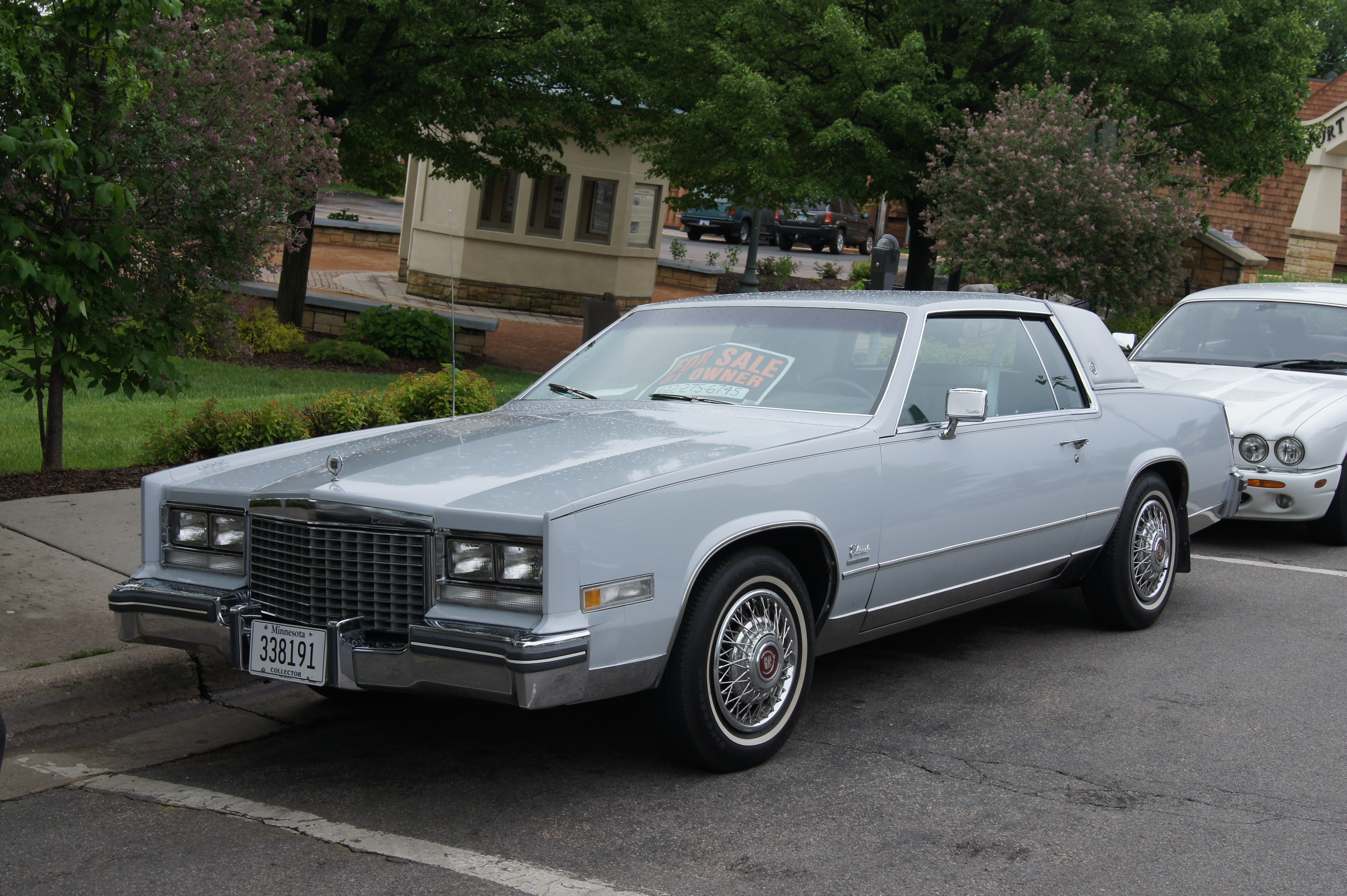
- 1979 Cadillac Eldorado

Overview
- Production: 1979–1985
- Assembly: Linden Assembly, Linden, New Jersey, U.S.

Body and chassis
- Body style: 2-door coupé 2-door convertible (1984–1985 only)
- Layout: Longitudinal front-engine, front-wheel drive
- Platform: E-body
- Related: Buick Riviera; Oldsmobile Toronado

Powertrain
- Engine: 4.1 L LC4 V6; 4.1 L HT-4100 V8; 5.7 L Rocket 350 V8; 5.7 L LF9 V8 diesel; 6.0 L L62 V8
- Transmission: 3-speed automatic (1979–81); 4-speed w/electronic overdrive (1982–1985)

Dimensions
- Wheelbase: 114.0 in (2,896 mm)
- Length: 204.5 in (5,194 mm) (1982–85); 204.0 in (5,182 mm) (1979–1981)
- Width: 71.4 in (1,814 mm) (1979–1981); 71.5 in (1,816 mm) (1982–83); 70.6 in (1,793 mm) (1984–85)
- Height: 54.3 in (1,379 mm) (1982–1985); 54.2 in (1,377 mm) (1979–1981)

The tenth generation Eldorado debuted in 1979, continuing to share the same platform with the Buick Riviera and Oldsmobile Toronado. This model was successful in terms of annual production totals compared with the ninth and eleventh generations. The model set an all-time Eldorado sales record in 1984 of 77,806 (coupes and convertibles), accounting for about 26% of all Cadillacs sold.

=== Design ===
Independent rear suspension was adopted for the first time, helping retain rear-seat and trunk room in the smaller body. A notable styling element was its nearly vertical rear window. The "Biarritz" trim level featured a stainless-steel roof cap (similar to the 1957–1958 Eldorado Brougham), wider chrome trim along the top of the doors and rear quarter glass, and additional fender spear moldings. The Eldorado featured frameless door glass, and rear quarter windows, similar to those from 1967 to 1970, without a thick "B" pillar. The Eldorado and the redesigned 1980 Cadillac Seville shared front wheel drive platforms. The cars were not true hardtops, as the rear quarter windows were fixed.

The Cadillac Trip Computer was available for 1979 models. First offered on the 1978 Cadillac Seville, it replaced the conventional analog speedometer and fuel gauge with digital readouts. A 12-button panel mounted above the climate control allowed for selection of operating data to be displayed on a third display located where the Coolant Temp light would be on the analog cluster. Just as with the Seville, this option was not available with the diesel engine as it required interfacing to the gasoline 350 engine's analog ECU. 1980 saw a major electrical architecture change to support the new DEFI 368 drivetrain which was GM's first implementation of Digital Fuel Injection. This included a new electronic climate control interface as well as an MPG Sentinel display which made the Trip Computer mostly superfluous. A digital speedometer cluster was not yet available with this new system, but would return for 1981, along with a significant number of hardware improvements. Unlike the Trip Computer speedometer, this version used vacuum fluorescent displays and allowed for selection of either English or Metric units. This option was offered on both Eldorado and Seville through 1985.

=== Engines ===
The tenth-generation Eldorado was available with multiple engine variants; four gasoline and one diesel option. In 1981, Cadillac offered a V6 for the first time in its history, a 4.1 liter engine sourced from Buick.

==== 350 ====
For 1979, the analog-injected Oldsmobile 350 ci (5.7 L) gasoline V8 was carried over from the Seville model. California-emission models differed in that they had a modified ECU, special catalyst system, and an O2 sensor for closed-loop operation. This would also be the standard CA-spec engine for 1980.

==== 368 ====
In 1980, the standard engine was a Cadillac 368 ci (6.0L) gasoline V8. This was a reduced bore, reduced stroke version of the Cadillac 425/472/500 family. This was GM's first implementation of digital fuel injection and required an extensive redesign of the vehicle's electrical architecture, which was shared with the newly designed Seville. Unlike the previous multi-port arrangement on the 350, this system used throttle body injection.

==== 4.1 L ====
For 1982, Cadillac unveiled the 4.1 L "High Technology" HT-4100 engine. The performance was modest relative to older generations of the Eldorado. It possessed 125 hp (93 kW), powering the car to a top speed of 106 mph (171 km/h) and a 0-60 time of 13.8 sec, with fuel economy of 8.5 km/L (24 mpg_{‑imp}; 20 mpg_{‑US})

This lightweight engine, used in all full-size 1982 Cadillacs (except limousines), was a wet-sleeve design that mated cast-iron heads to an aluminum block. Many HT-4100s were replaced under warranty due to aluminum oil pump failure, cam bearing displacement, intake gasket failure (scrubbing of the bi-metal interface), weak aluminum block castings and bolts pulling the aluminum threads from the block.

==== 350 diesel ====
The Oldsmobile 350 ci diesel engine was available as an option all years, but its popularity waned due to its unreliable reputation and the inversion of gasoline to diesel pricing during the early 1980s. Initially rated 126 PS (93 kW; 125 hp), design changes and reduction in compression ratio reduced its output to 106 PS (78.0 kW; 104.5 bhp). A diesel-equipped 1982 model with this engine had a top speed of 155 km/h (96 mph) and a 0-60 time of 17.3 sec, with fuel economy of 25 mpg.

==== V8-6-4 L62 ====
For 1981 only, the Eldorado was fitted with a V8-6-4 variable displacement variant of the 368 engine. Four solenoids fitted to the cylinder heads allowed deactivation of two or four cylinders under light load conditions, and only when in high gear. The system was dropped due to customer complaints regarding vibration, and failure to gain agreement with the NHTSA on appropriate government fuel economy (CAFE) ratings, defeating the initial intent of the system. On CAFE-exempt vehicles, such as the limousine and commercial chassis, the V8-6-4 system continued to be used through 1984 and was discontinued at the end of the model year.

The 368 engine itself was very durable, its only modification being solenoids attached to the heads, but the electronics, software and valve switch gear were the source of continued customer complaints. Since modulated displacement mode only operated when the transmission was in high gear, disabling the system was as simple as unplugging a single connector, leaving the engine to operate on all eight cylinders.

==== V6 LC4 ====
In pursuit of additional CAFE credits, the Buick LC4 V6 engine was available for 1981 and 1982. It came with a 4-barrel carburetor, had an 8.0:1 compression ratio, and produces 125 hp (93 kW) at 4,000 rpm and 205 lb⋅ft (278 N⋅m) at 2,000 RPM. As was the case with diesel-equipped Eldorado models, the MPG Sentinel was not available, though a modified digital speedometer cluster was offered, which removed the Fuel Range display.

=== Trim options ===
From 1982 through 1985, Cadillac offered the Eldorado Touring Coupe, with heavier duty "touring" suspension, close-ratio steering, aluminum alloy wheels, larger blackwall white-letter tires, cloisonné hood ornament, body-colored headlamp and taillamp bezels, wide-ribbed rocker moldings and available in limited color options.

These Eldorados were marketed as "drivers' cars" and included reclining front bucket seats with lumbar support, leather-wrapped steering wheel and a center console. The diesel engine was not available with this package.

Late in the 1985 model year, an optional "Commemorative Edition" package was announced, in honor of the last year of production for this version of the Eldorado. Exclusive features included gold-tone script and tail-lamp emblems, specific sail panel badges, gold-background wheel center caps, and a Commemorative Edition badge on the steering wheel horn pad. Leather upholstery (available in dark blue or white, or a two-tone with dark blue and white) was included in the offering, along with a dark blue dashboard and carpeting. Exterior colors were cotillion white or commodore blue.

=== Return of the Eldorado Convertible ===
In 1984, eight years after Cadillac built its last convertible, the division temporarily resumed production of a convertible version of the Eldorado Biarritz. This car was an official Cadillac production option convertible converted by American Sunroof Corporation (ASC), and was offered only for the 1984–85 model years, coded by vehicle VIN. The car was 200 pounds (91 kg) heavier, featuring the same interior as the Eldorado Biarritz coupe. The 1985 model year was also the last for the aftermarket non-factory option conversions by ASC.

Prior to the official 1984 and 1985 Eldorado convertibles marketed by Cadillac, some 1979–1983 Eldorados were made into coach convertibles by independent coachbuilders such as ASC, Custom Coach (who had turned a few 1977 and 1978 Eldorados into convertibles), and Hess & Eisenhardt. The same coachbuilders also offered Buick Riviera and Oldsmobile Toronado convertibles.

=== Production totals ===
Production totals
| Year | Model | Units |
|---|---|---|
| 1979 | Eldorado coupe | 67,436 |
| 1980 | Eldorado coupe | 52,685 |
| 1981 | Eldorado coupe | 60,643 |
| 1982 | Eldorado coupe | 52,018 |
| 1983 | Eldorado coupe | 67,416 |
| 1984 | Eldorado coupe | 74,506 |
| 1984 | Eldorado convertible | 3,300 |
| 1985 | Eldorado coupe | 74,101 |
| 1985 | Eldorado convertible | 2,200 |

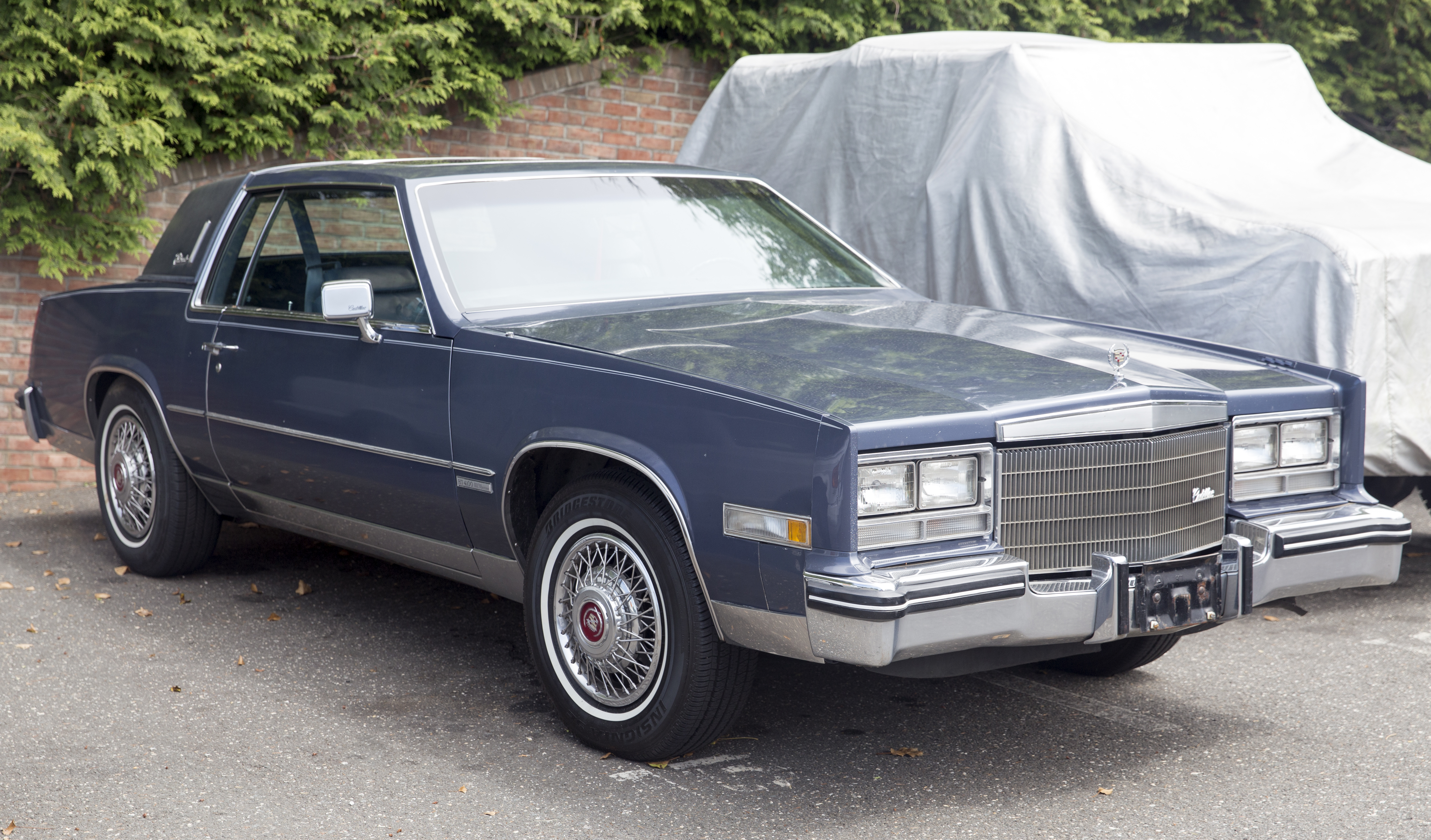
1983 Cadillac Eldorado coupe

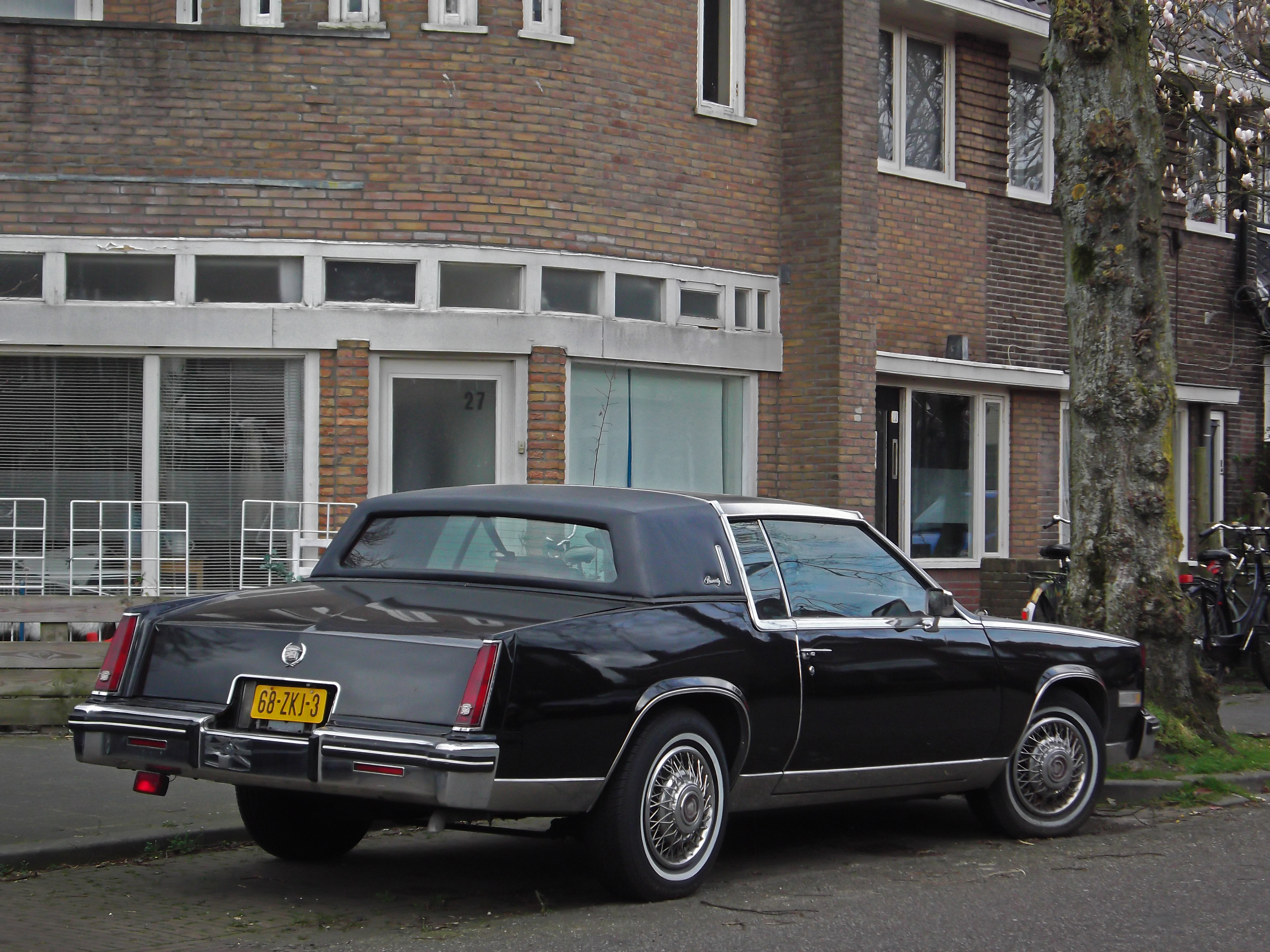
1984 Cadillac Eldorado (rear)

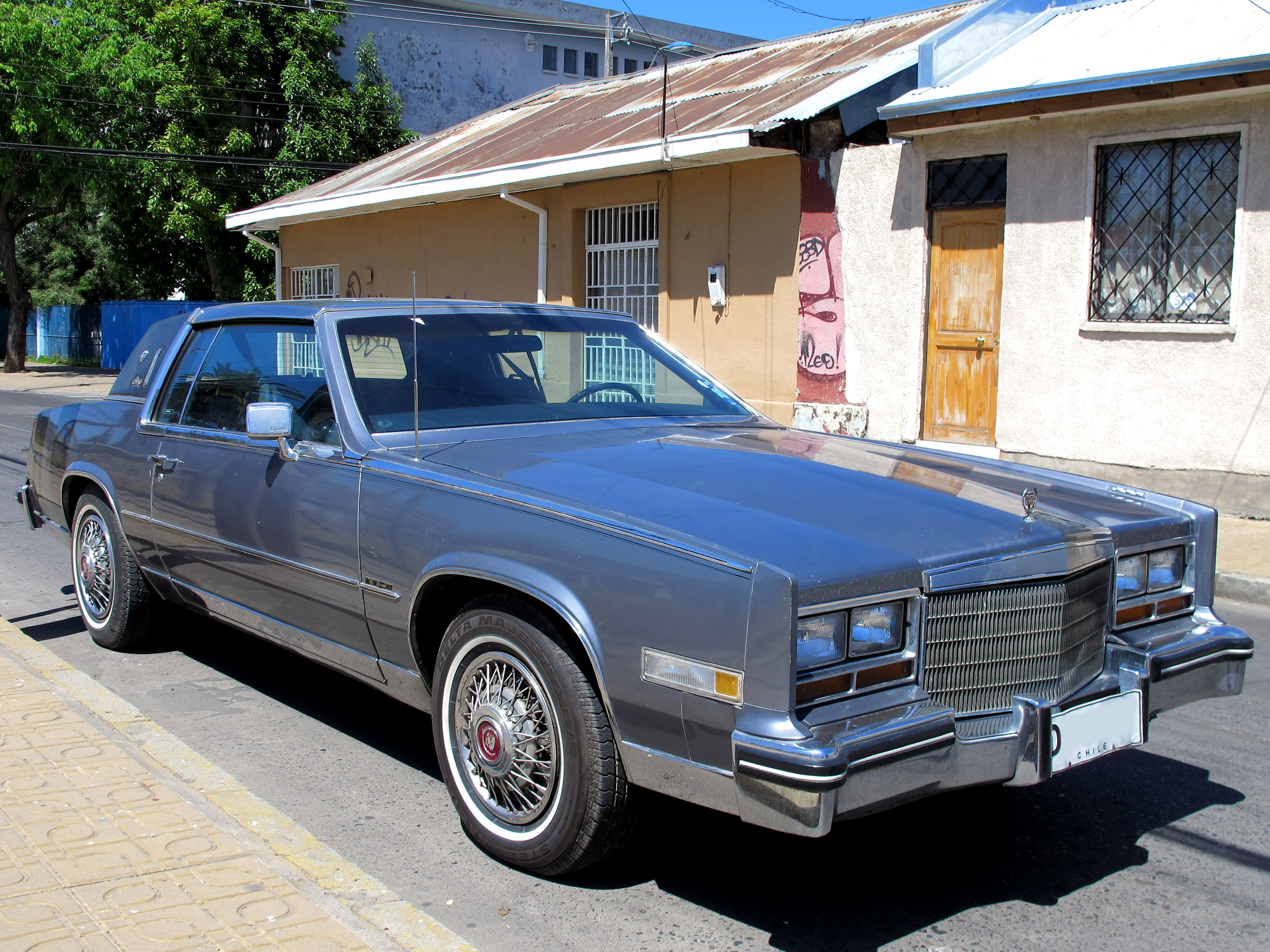
1982 Cadillac Eldorado Biarritz coupe

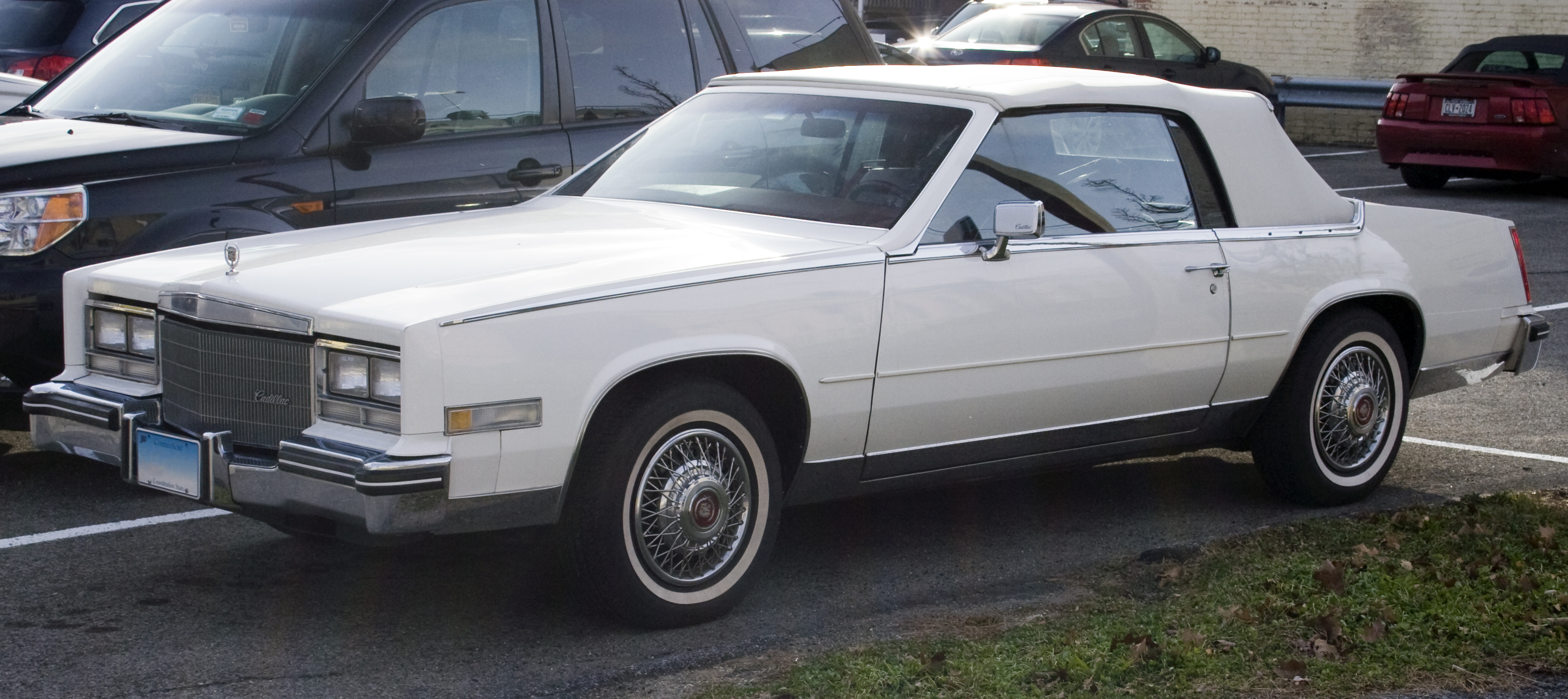
1984–1985 Cadillac Eldorado convertible

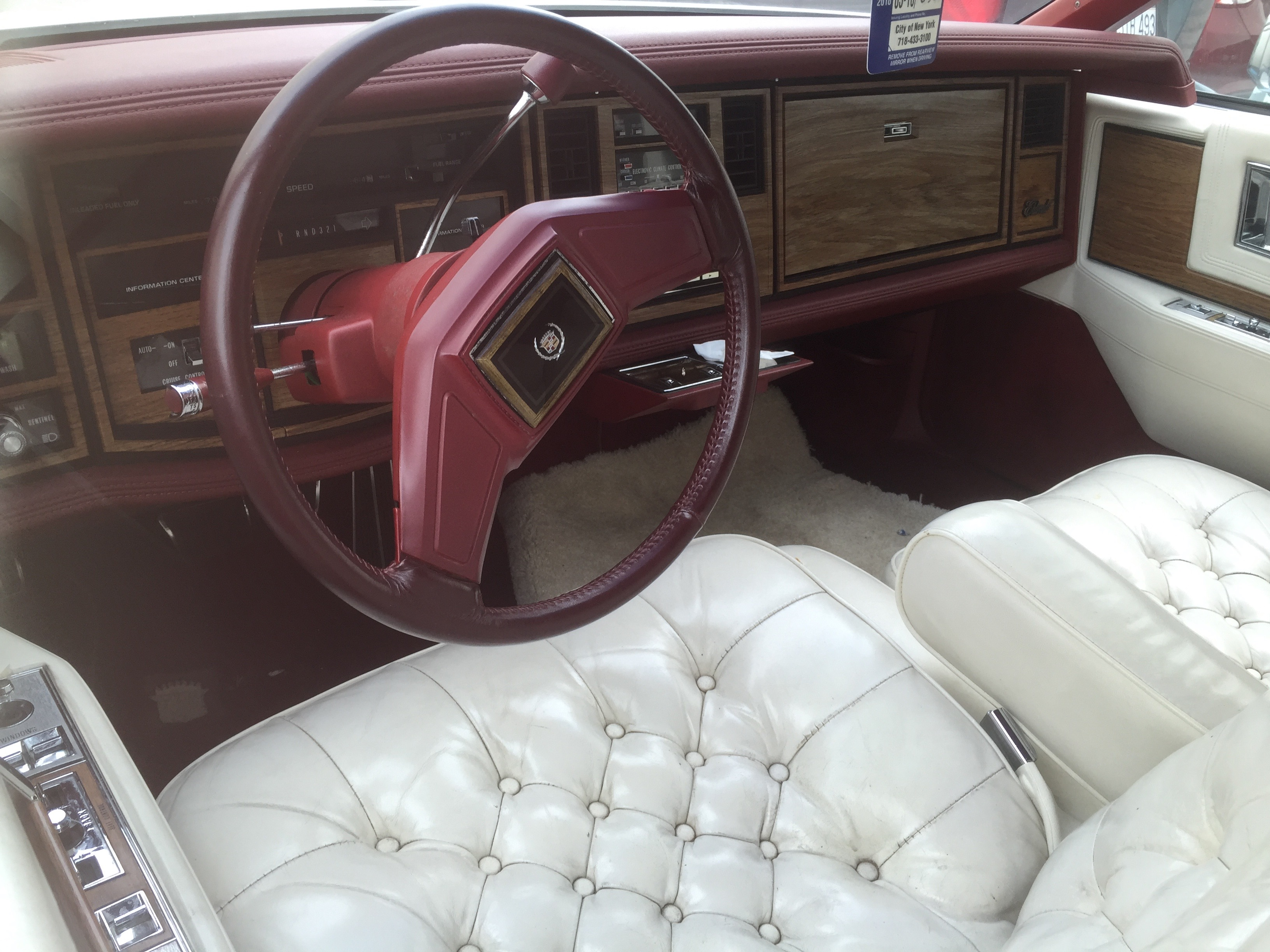
1984 Cadillac Eldorado Biarritz convertible interior

== Eleventh generation (1986–1991) ==
Eleventh generation
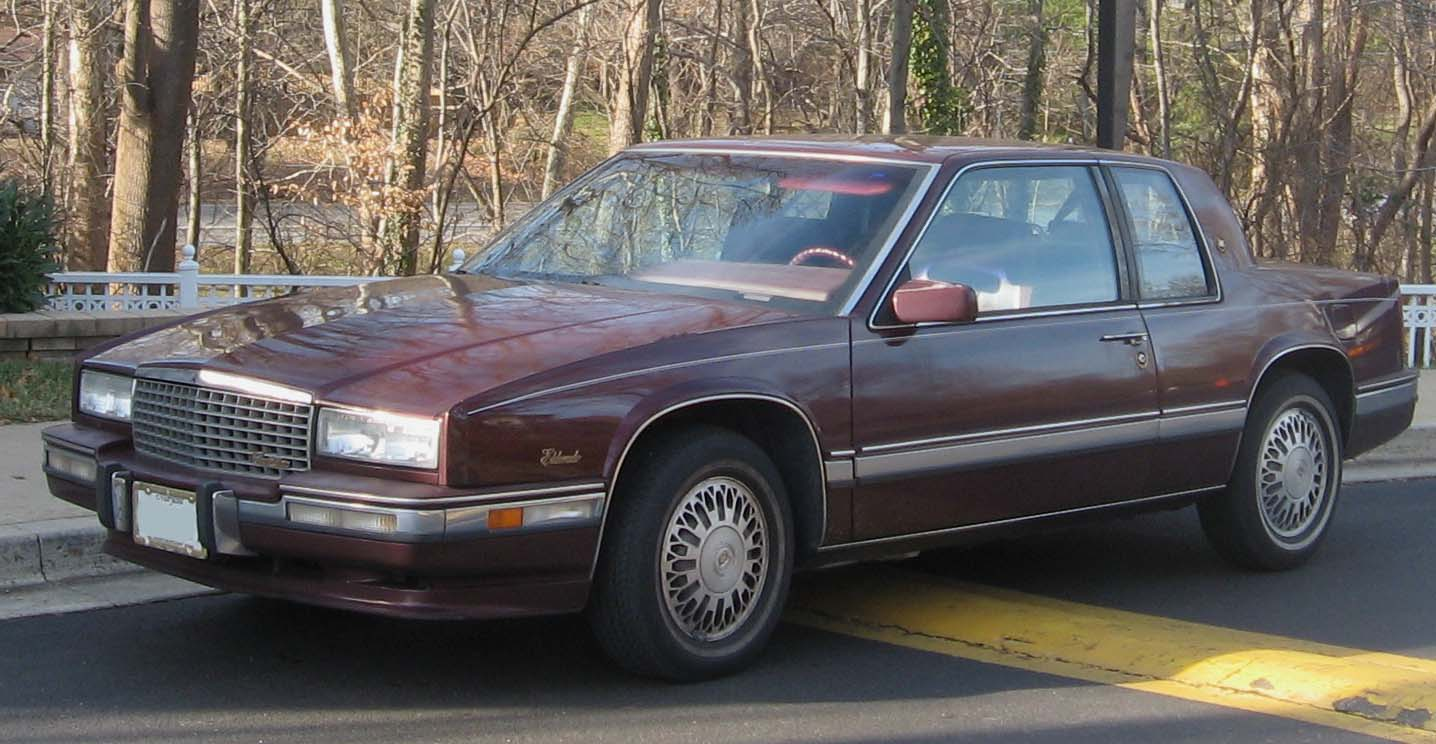

Overview
- Production: 1986–1991
- Assembly: Detroit/Hamtramck Assembly, Hamtramck, Michigan, U.S.
- Designer: Irv Rybicki

Body and chassis
- Body style: 2-door coupé
- Layout: Transverse front-engine, front-wheel drive
- Platform: E-body
- Related: Buick Riviera; Oldsmobile Toronado

Powertrain
- Engine: 4.1 L HT-4100 V8 (1986–1987); 4.5 L 4.5 V8 (1988–1990); 4.9 L L26 V8 (1991)
- Transmission: 4-speed THM440-T4 automatic

Dimensions
- Wheelbase: 108.0 in (2,743 mm)
- Length: 191.4 in (4,862 mm) (1989–1991); 191.2 in (4,856 mm) (1986–88)
- Width: 72.4 in (1,839 mm) (1989–1991); 71.7 in (1,821 mm) (1986–88)
- Height: 53.2 in (1,351 mm) (1989–1991); 53.7 in (1,364 mm) (1986–88)

As a key factor influencing the design of the 11th-generation Eldorado, GM relied on a consultant's prediction that gasoline would rise sharply by 1986. Concluding that smaller luxury cars would be in demand, General Motors downsized its full-sized cars for the second time for the 1985 model year; though higher fuel prices failed to materialize. By then, Cadillac had downsized the 11th generation Eldorado substantially — by 16 inches (410 mm) in length and 350 pounds (159 kg) in weight — as with its badge engineered siblings, the Oldsmobile Toronado, Buick Riviera, and Cadillac Seville.

Buick and Oldsmobile's variants carried Buick's 3.8-liter V6 engine, while the Eldorado continued with the 4.1-liter V8. A single fiberglass transverse leaf spring was used for its fully independent rear suspension. Four wheel disc brakes were standard, as was electronic leveling control. The completely redesigned instrument panel featured a full digital display. The shift lever was moved from the steering column to the center console. New redesigned bucket seats had lumbar support. The Biarritz option featured an upgraded interior with genuine walnut trim on the instrument panel, center console and door panels.

The 1985 convertible body style was dropped to make way for the forthcoming Cadillac Allanté roadster. For the first time, the Eldorado no longer featured a hardtop body style, instead using framed door glass. Despite its much smaller exterior size, the Eldorado's interior volume remained comparable to the previous generation.

The 11th-generation carried a base price of $24,251 (~$61,548 in 2025), nearly 16% higher than the 1985 model. Between the high price and the substantial downsizing, sales of the Eldorado dropped 72% from the final year of the previous generation. One automotive observer noted that the 11th-generation Eldorado was too small for Cadillac's traditional customers, yet unable to attract buyers from the intended competitors, e.g. BMW and Mercedes-Benz.

=== Model year changes ===
==== 1987 ====
Aside from a longer, five-year/50,000 mile warranty, the Eldorado was virtually unchanged for 1987, save for a price drop to $23,740 ($67,277 in 2025 dollars). The standard suspension, with new taller 75 series (previously 70) tires and hydro-elastic engine mounts, was slightly retuned for a softer ride, while the optional ($155) "touring suspension" ($439 in 2025 dollars), with deflected-disc strut valves and 15-inch alloy wheels, remained for those desiring a firmer ride. As part of a federal requirement to discourage "chop-shop" thieves, major body panels were etched with the VIN. Also new, a combination cashmere cloth with leather upholstery, and locking inertia seat belt reels for rear seat passengers, which allowed for child-seat installation in the outboard seating positions in back. The formal cabriolet roof was added this year. Available for $495 on the base Eldorado, it featured a padded covering over the rear half of the roof, and turned the rear side glass into smaller opera windows. One of the Eldorado's most expensive standalone options was the Motorola cellular telephone mounted inside the locking center arm rest. Priced at $2,850 ($8,077 in 2025 dollars), it had been reworked this year for easier operation, and featured a microphone mounted between the sun visors for hands-free operation. Additionally, the telephone featured a radio mute control: activated when the telephone and radio were in use simultaneously, it automatically decreased the rear speaker's audio volume, and over-rode the front music speakers to be used for the hands-free telephone.

==== 1988 facelift ====
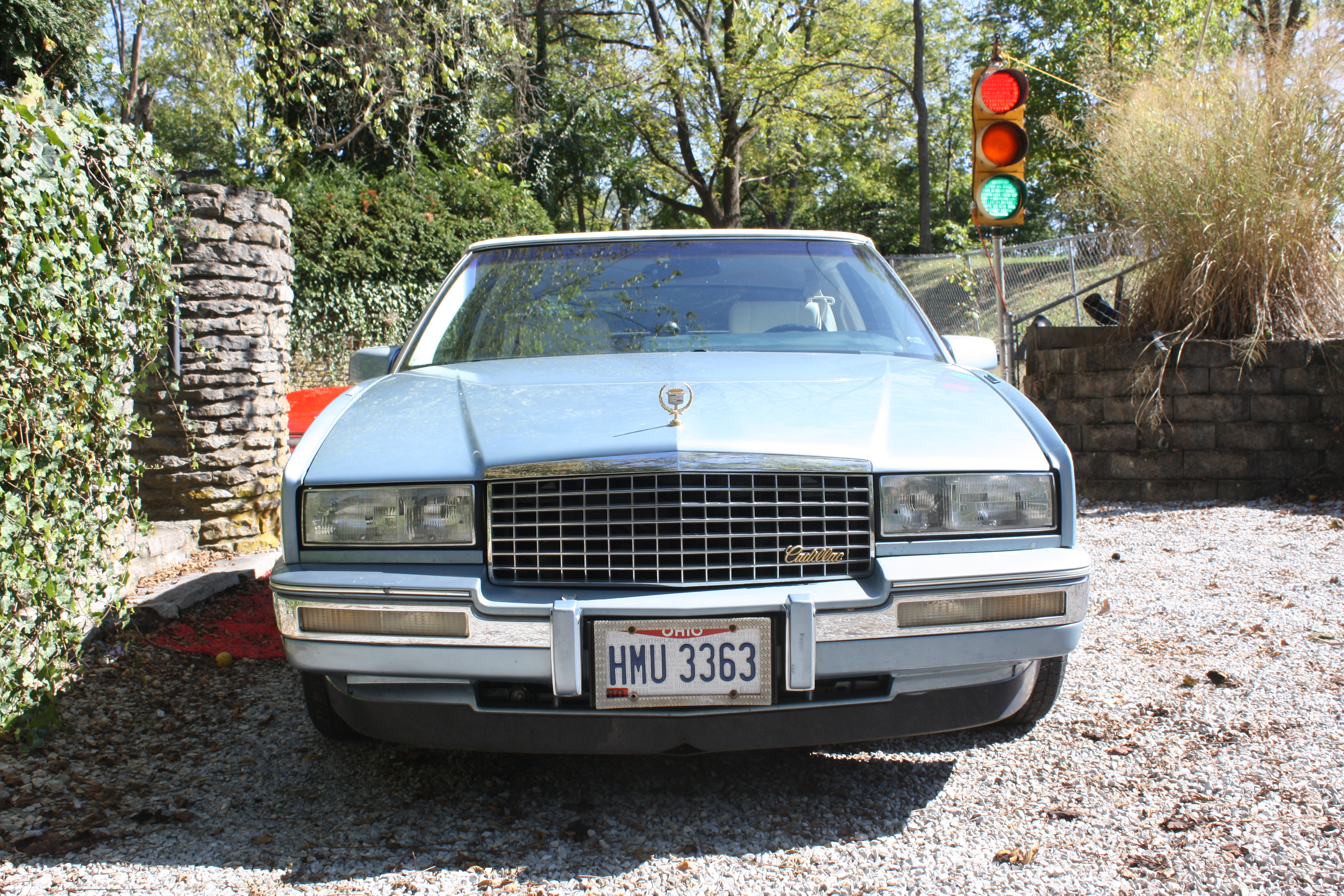
1988 Cadillac Eldorado front grille

The 1988 Eldorado received a facelift and sales nearly doubled from the previous year, up to 33,210. Essentially, the revision lengthened the rear fender end-caps, making the Eldorado 3 in (76 mm) longer than in 1987; the wheelbase, doors, roof, and glass remained unchanged and body panels were revised. Standard equipment included Cadillac's new 155 horsepower 4.5 liter V8. A comprehensive anti-lock braking system, developed by Teves, was newly available. Both front and rear fenders featured creased blade elements that rose slightly proud of the adjacent sheetmetal. Revisions included a new grille above the revamped front bumper, slightly protruding three-sided tail lamps and a revised rear bumper and trunk lid. Bladed 14-inch aluminum wheels remained standard, while an optional 15-inch snowflake-pattern alloy wheel was included with the touring suspension option.

The 1988 interior featured wider front seat headrests and swing-away door pull handles, replacing pull-straps. New upholstery patterns, along with shoulder belts for outboard rear-seat passengers, appeared for both base and Biarritz models, with the latter returning to the tufted-button design last seen in the 1985 Biarritz. A new vinyl roof option, covering the full rooftop, featured a band of body color above the side door and windows, similar to the style used until 1978. This replaced the "cabriolet roof" option, which covered the rear half of the roof, introduced just a year earlier. With the Biarritz option package, the padded vinyl roof covered just the rear quarter of the rooftop, behind the rear side windows. Biarritz also included slender vertical opera lamps, as in 1986 and 1987, but now added a spear molding (similar to the style used on the 1976–1985 Eldorado Biarritz) that ran from the base of the rooftop, continuing horizontally along the door, and down to the front fender tip. The standard power antenna was moved from the front passenger fender to the rear passenger fender. Nineteen shades of exterior paint were available (two more than the previous year). Prices increased this year to $24,891 ($67,760 in 2025 dollars).

==== 1989 ====
For 1989, the optional automatic rearview mirror transitioned from an electrically operated mechanical tilting mechanism to the new electrochromic style, using a clear fluid filled between the mirror and a thin sheet of glass, which tints on activation. A new exterior color, White Diamond, brought the color choices up to 18. Gone were the 14-inch wheels, as the previously optional 15-inch "snowflake"-style aluminum wheel, introduced the previous year, was made standard for the base Eldorado. A compact disc player, available only with the Delco/Bose Gold Series music system, was a new option this year, as were reversible floor mats, and gold-plated ornamentation ("Cadillac" grille and trunk scripts, sail panel ornaments, deck lid engine plaque, trunk lock cover, tail lamp emblems, and available wire wheel cover wreath and crest). New standard items included an express-down module for the driver's window, electronic oil-life indicator, a more powerful Delco Freedom II battery, a revised factory warranty, and GM's PASS (Passive Automotive Security System) KEY theft deterrent system, which activated the fuel system based upon a coded pellet within the ignition key. Previously optional items that were now added as standard equipment included a cassette player with graphic equalizer, remote fuel filler door release, and front license plate mounting. To deplete existing warehouse stock, the brushed chrome lower bodyside accent molding, optional through last year, was added as standard equipment for 1989 (revamped moldings would appear in 1990). New high-gloss Birdseye Maple trim (replacing the satin-finished American walnut used from 1986 to 1988) on the instrument panel and console was standard on Eldorado Biarritz, and a $245 option on the base Eldorado. The full cabriolet roof option, roughly simulating a convertible top, was offered in limited colors. Prices rose to $26,738 ($69,447 in 2025 dollars). Production slipped slightly to 27,807 (including 7,174 Biarritz models). Similarly, the restyled Buick Riviera grew 11 inches this year and had a production increase from 8,625 cars in 1988 to 21,189 in 1989.

==== 1990 ====
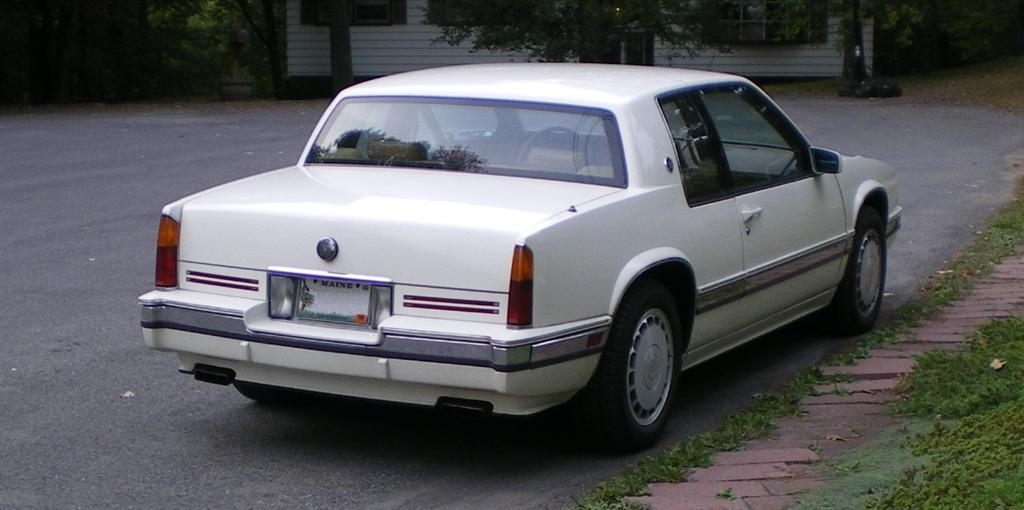
1990 Cadillac Eldorado touring coupe

A driver-side airbag was introduced as standard equipment, deleting the telescoping steering column but retaining tilt capability. Where cruise controls had been previously mounted on the center of the steering wheel, the air bag required a smaller diameter steering wheel, and controls moved to the turn signal lever. A Touring Coupe trim level was introduced later in the model year. A new multi-point fuel injection replaced the throttle-body style from the MY88, and horsepower increased from 155 to 180, requiring premium fuel. The front suspension stabilizer shaft was revised; "Snowflake" alloy wheels were standard, with an optional cast aluminum wheel design, not available with the touring suspension package; and the tire jack received a dedicated carpeted storage compartment in the trunk.

Interior revisions for 1990 included new molded seat trim panels, front bucket seats featuring additional lateral and lumbar support, French seams, and revised front headrests. Full leather upholstery (formerly leather and cloth) became standard on the Biarritz trim level, and the base model lost their seat-back map pockets. The optional cellular telephone was no longer available, and the vinyl center armrest was revised. The electronic climate control received three automatic and two manual settings. The optional leather upholstery package for the base model now included a power passenger seat recliner. 1990 models incorporated the former "Eldorado option package" as standard equipment, including revised carpeted floor mats, body-color door edge guards, illuminated driver and passenger visor, trunk mat, and an illuminated entry system. Previously optional equipment became standard equipment, including the rear window defogger with heated outside mirrors and bodyside accent striping.

New options included a central-unlocking feature (from the outside door locks, using the key) added to the automatic door locks. For 1990, the rear deck lid carried a port fuel injection emblem, featured a chrome handle above the license plate opening and rear safety reflectors moved from the bumper onto the panel below the decklid. A charcoal-color vinyl strip accented the chrome bumper and bodyside moldings, while the front bumper guards changed from body-color to charcoal.

MSRP for 1990 base Eldorado was $28,885 ($71,182 in 2025 dollars) and for the Biarritz trim level an additional $3,180 ($7,837 in 2025 dollars). Production dropped to 22,291 cars, about 1/3 of which were the Biarritz package and 1,507 were the Eldorado touring coupe package.

==== 1991 ====
1991 was the final year for the eleventh-generation Eldorado. New this year was Cadillac's 4.9 liter port fuel injection V-8 engine with GM's 4T60-E electronically controlled four-speed transmission. The Cadillac-exclusive "viscous converter clutch" provided smoother shifting under hard acceleration. Engine controls were monitored by the GMP4 powertrain control module (PCM), an on-board 64-kilobyte computer. A new exhaust set-up with a wider catalytic converter reduced restriction by 38% from 1990, while the 0-60 mph speed went from 9 seconds in 1990 to 8.2 for 1991. Revised engine mounts decreased cabin noise and vibration. Adaptive suspension, marketed as Computer Command Ride (CCR), automatically adapted the suspension mode to vehicle speed for improved handling and ride comfort; this system was standard on Eldorado and optional on most other Cadillac models. The Bosch II anti-lock braking system, previously a $925 option, was made standard, as well as a more powerful 140-amp alternator.

A $309 electrically heated windshield became optional, as was the "security package" ($480 on base Eldorado, no-charge on Biarritz or Touring Coupe) which now included remote keyless entry along with automatic door locks and central unlocking. A $480 theft-deterrent system was also optional on the base Eldorado and available for no-charge on the Biarritz or Touring Coupe. The windshield washer system was revised.

The base price for the 1991 Eldorado was $31,245 ($76,998 in 2025 dollars), a $2,400 increase from 1990. Several items became no-charge options on the base Eldorado, including a full vinyl roof covering or full-cabriolet (convertible-look) roof (an otherwise $1,095 option), leather upholstery with power passenger recliner, and the Delco-Bose sound system, available with CD or cassette. For 1991, the $2,050 (~$4,846 in 2025) Touring Coupe and the $3,180 Biarritz trim packages included a power moon roof and Delco-Bose stereo system at no additional charge. 1991 marked the final year for the Eldorado Biarritz. Production dropped to 16,212 (including 2,249 touring coupe models), the lowest for any Eldorado model since 1966.

=== Production totals ===
11th Generation Production
| Year | Model | Units |
|---|---|---|
| 1986 | Eldorado coupe | 21,342 |
| 1987 | Eldorado coupe | 17,775 |
| 1988 | Eldorado coupe | 33,210 |
| 1989 | Eldorado coupe | 27,807 |
| 1990 | Eldorado coupe | 22,291 |
| 1991 | Eldorado coupe | 16,212 |

== Twelfth generation (1992–2002) ==
Twelfth generation
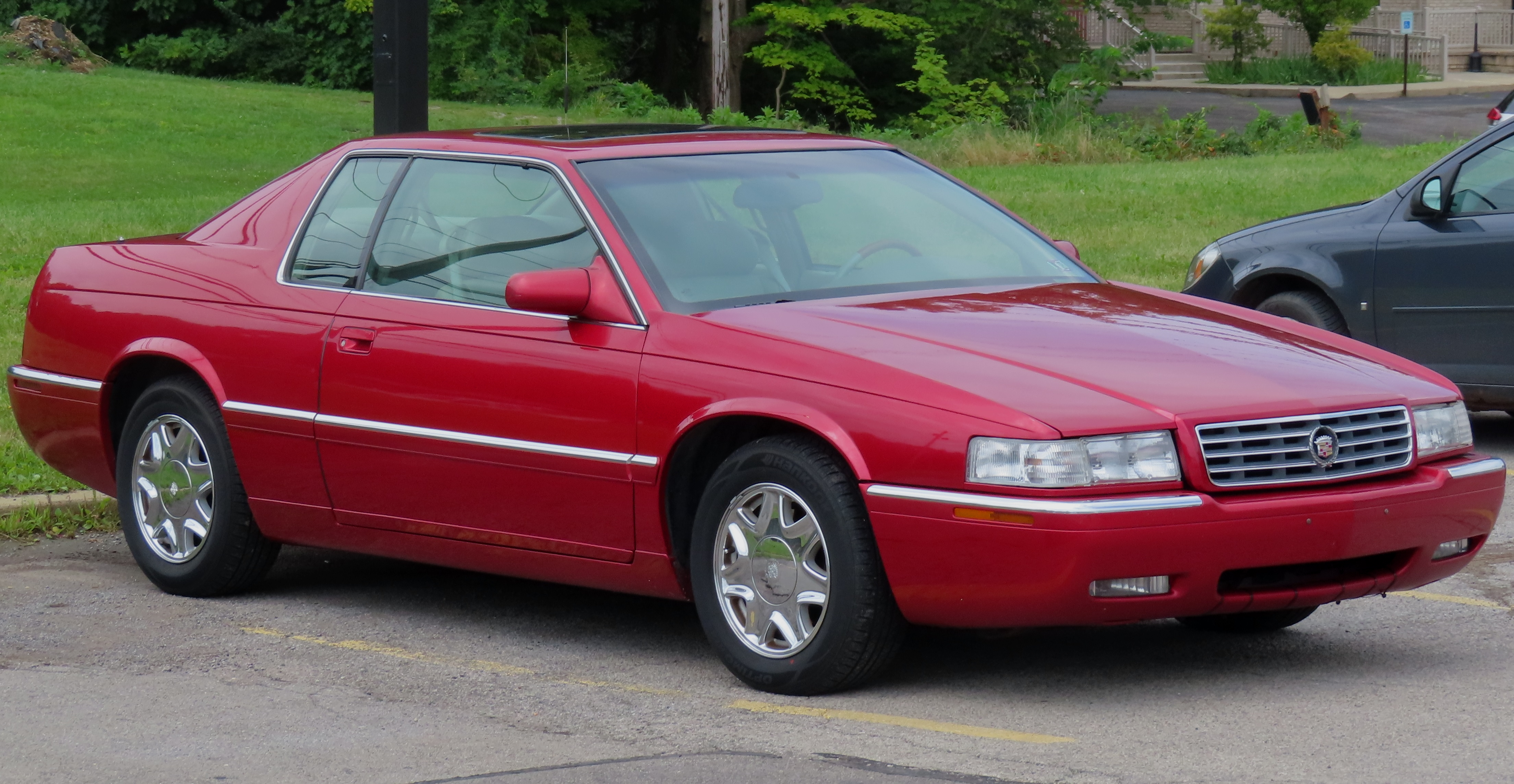
- 2001 Cadillac Eldorado Sport Coupe

Overview
- Model years: 1992–2002
- Assembly: Detroit/Hamtramck Assembly, Hamtramck, Michigan, U.S. (1992–2000); Lansing Craft Center, Lansing, Michigan, U.S. (2000–2002)
- Designer: Dick Ruzzin (1990)

Body and chassis
- Body style: 2-door coupé
- Layout: Transverse front-engine, front-wheel drive
- Platform: E-body
- Related: Buick Riviera; Oldsmobile Toronado

Powertrain
- Engine: 4.9 L L26 V8 (1992–1993); 4.6 L L37 V8 (1993–2002, ETC); 4.6 L LD8 V8 (1994–2002, ESC)
- Transmission: 4-speed 4T60-E automatic 4-speed 4T80-E automatic

Dimensions
- Wheelbase: 108.0 in (2,743 mm)
- Length: 202.2 in (5,136 mm) (1992–94); 200.6 in (5,095 mm) (1995–2002)
- Width: 75.5 in (1,918 mm)
- Height: 54.0 in (1,372 mm)

Chronology
- Successor: Cadillac CTS coupe

The twelfth and final generation Eldorado, introduced for 1992, was 11 in (279 mm) longer and 3 in (76 mm) wider than the previous generation, featuring frameless window glass. Marketed in either ESC (Eldorado Sport Coupe) and ETC (Eldorado Touring Coupe) trim, the former featured a stand-up hood ornament, Cadillac crests on the rear roof pillar, 16-inch multi-spoke alloy wheels, and concealed exhausts.

The Eldorado was offered with the 200 hp (150 kW) 4.9 L L26 engine for 1992 and 1993, and subsequently with the Northstar V8 in both 270 and 295 hp (220 kW) variants.

Standard equipment included cloth upholstery, Zebrano wood trim, 6-way power front bucket seats, climate control, digital instrumentation, column-mounted gear selector, and three-position electronically adjustable "Speed-Sensitive Suspension". The ETC featured a grille-mounted Cadillac wreath and crest, "Touring Coupe" scripts on the doors, integrated fog lamps, flat-face 16-inch alloy wheels, and quad exhaust outlets. Its standard equipment included gathered leather seating areas, marketed as Nuance leather; 12-way power seats; Zebrano-trimmed floor console with gear selector, analog instrumentation, and specially tuned suspension.

- 1993: The Touring Coupe received a two-spoke steering wheel, body-color grille, and 6-way seats, previously 12-way. An Eldorado Sport Coupe model was introduced, featuring the new Northstar V8 and quad-tipped exhaust, full-floor console with gear selector (without Zebrano trim), and touring-tuned adaptive suspension, now marketed as "Road Sensing Suspension". A passenger airbag became standard equipment on all models, the previously matte-black exterior side mirrors from 1992 were now body-color, and revised 16-inch chromed alloy wheels became available.
- 1994: Eldorado and Eldorado Touring Coupe trims were offered. The steering wheel was revised to a four-spoke design. Both models now had quad exhausts. A new "Sport Appearance Package" option allowed the buyer to order most of the Touring Coupe's cosmetic features on the base Eldorado.
- 1995: The Eldorado featured revised front and rear bumpers, side cladding, chrome eggcrate grille, and seven-spoke alloy wheels.
- 1996: The interior received a larger analog gauge cluster, relocated climate control system, and updated stereo faces. While the four-spoke steering wheel was a carry-over, new steering wheel-mounted duplicate climate and audio controls. The Touring Coupe offered perforated leather in lieu of the gathered leather on other models. The Touring Coupe also received rain-sensing wipers marketed as "Rainsense", and once again a body color radiator grille. Daytime running lights were standard.
- 1997: Microprocessor integration of engine, traction control, Stabilitrak electronic stability control, steering, and adaptive continuously variable road sensing suspension (CVRSS) became standard, marketed as Integrated Chassis Control System — similar to the Toyota/Lexus Vehicle Dynamics Integrated Management (VDIM).
- 2000: With the Buick Riviera and Oldsmobile Toronado rebadged variants discontinued and the Seville and Deville sedan no longer sharing platforms, the Eldorado became GM's last production K- or E-body vehicle, and assembly was moved to the Lansing Craft Center.
- 2002: GM announced that the Eldorado's 50th model year would be its last. To mark the end of the nameplate, a limited run of 1,596 cars in red or white—the colors available on the original 1953 convertible—were produced in three batches of 532, signifying the Eldorado's first year of production. These last cars featured specially tuned exhaust notes imitating the models, and a dash-mounted plaque indicating each car's sequence in production. Production ended on April 22, 2002, and the last Eldorado produced was donated to the Cadillac Museum in honor of Cadillac dealer Don Massey. The Lansing Craft Center retooled to manufacture the Chevrolet SSR.
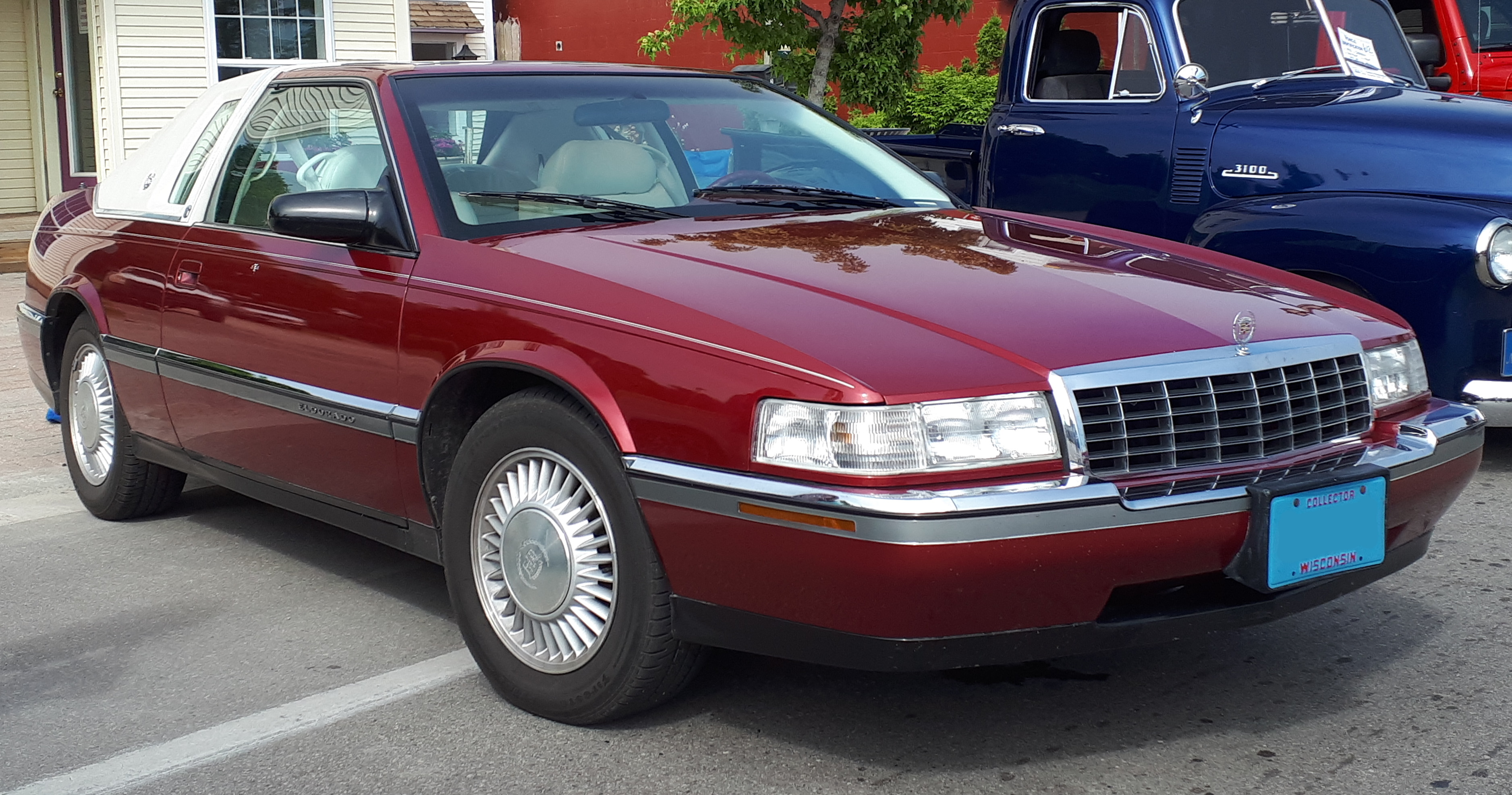
1992 Cadillac Eldorado Touring Coupe

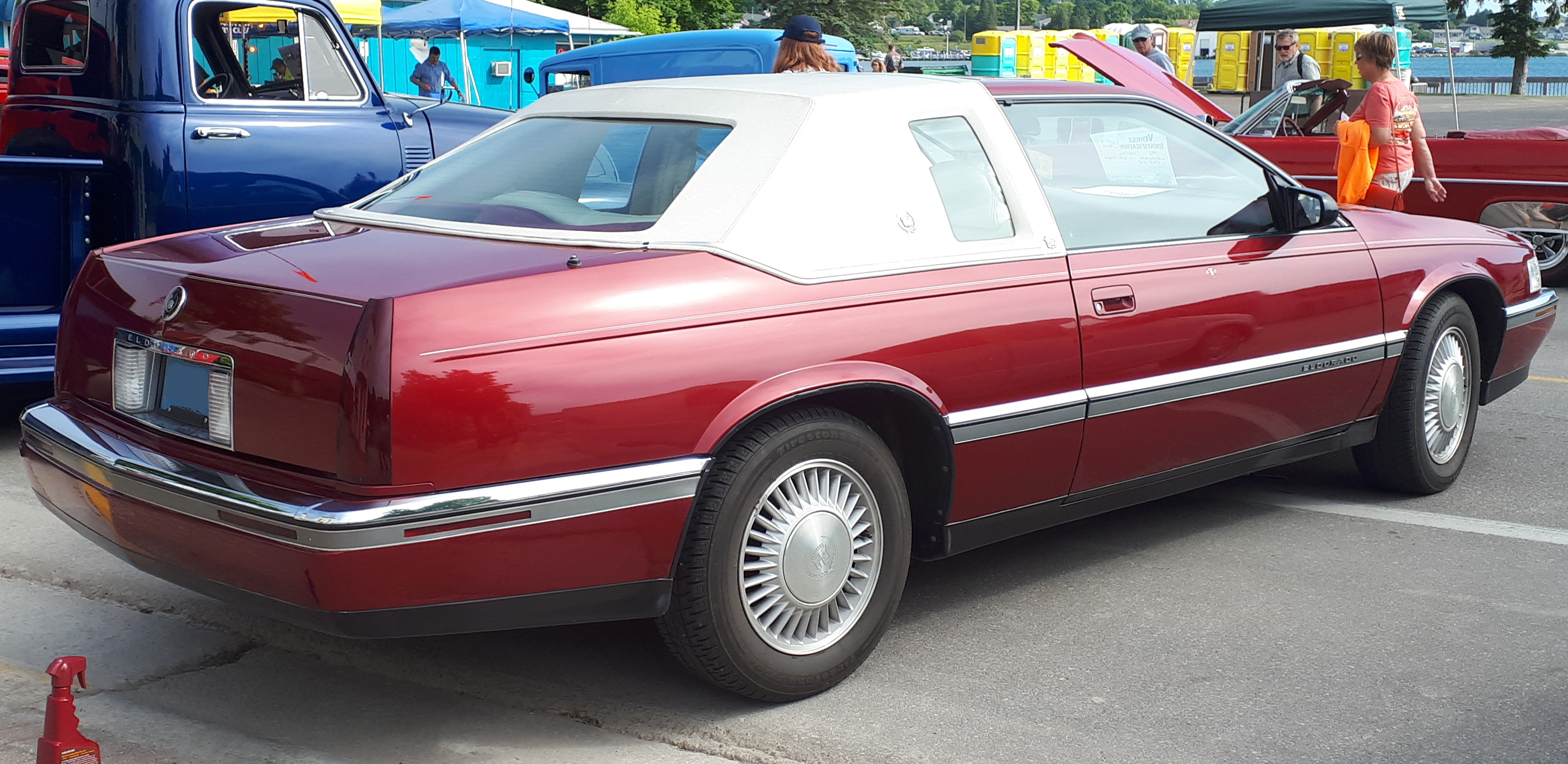
1992 Cadillac Eldorado Touring Coupe (rear)

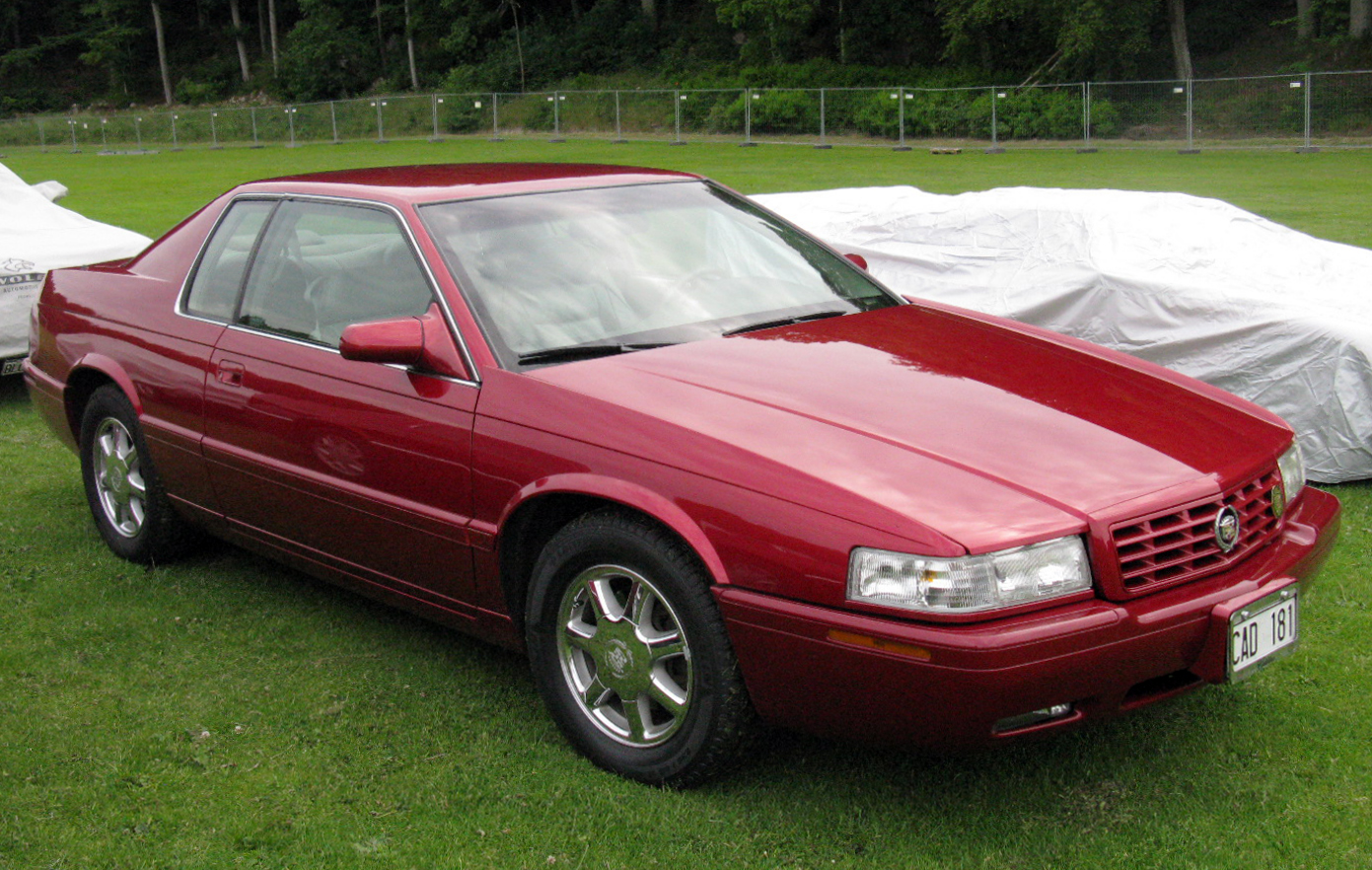
1999 Cadillac Eldorado

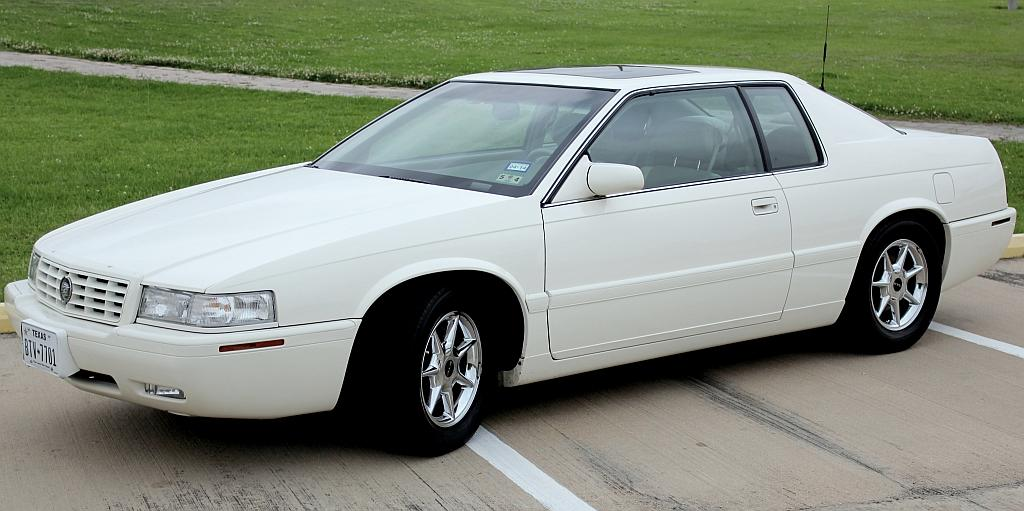
2002 Cadillac Eldorado Collector Series

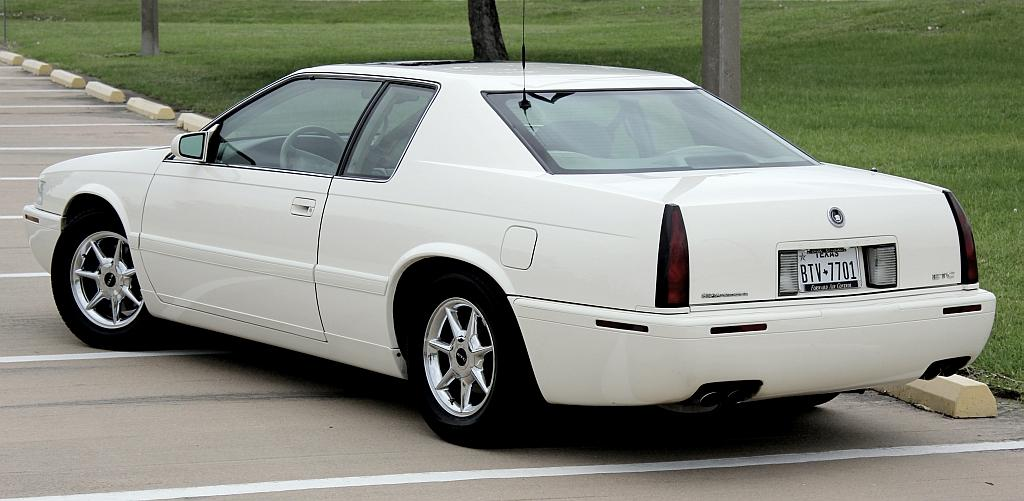
2002 Cadillac Eldorado Collector Series (rear)

== See also ==
- Lincoln Mark Series
- Ford Thunderbird
