= Saville =

Saville is a surname. Notable people with the surname include:

- Alan Saville (1946–2016), British archaeologist
- Bruce Saville (disambiguation), multiple people
- Frances Saville (1865–1935), Australian soprano
- George Saville (born 1993), British football player
- Glen Saville (born 1976), former Australian basketball player
- Gordon P. Saville (1902–1984), United States Air Force Major General
- Harriet Elizabeth Savill or Saville (1789–1857), English actress
- Ian Saville (born 1953), English magician
- Jack Saville (born 1991), British football player
- Jane Saville (born 1974), Australian racewalker
- Jenny Saville (born 1970), English artist
- John Saville (1916–2009), English Marxist historian
- John Faucit Saville or Savill, (1783?–1853), English actor and theatre manager
- Kate Saville (1835/1836–1922), English actress
- Kay Saville-Smith, New Zealand sociologist
- Luke Saville (born 1994), Australian tennis player
- Lynn Saville (born 1950), American photographer
- Malcolm Saville (1901–1982), English author
- Mark Saville, Baron Saville of Newdigate (born 1936), English judge, former Justice of the Supreme Court of the United Kingdom
- Marshall Howard Saville (1867–1935), American archaeologist
- Matthew Saville, Australian television and film director
- Matthew J. Saville, New Zealand actor and filmmaker, director of Juniper
- Natalie Saville (born 1978), Australian race walker
- Peter Saville (disambiguation), multiple people
- Philip Saville (1930–2016), British television and film director
- Sue Saville, English television journalist

== See also ==
- Savile
- Savill (surname)
- Savills
- Seville (disambiguation)
