= Savile =

Savile is a surname. Notable people with the surname include:

- Arthur Savile (1819–1870), English clergyman and cricketer
- David Savile, actor, married to Lois Baxter
- Douglas Barton Osborne Savile (1909–2000), mycologist
- Dorothy Savile, Viscountess Halifax (1640–1670)
- Dorothy Savile, Countess of Burlington and of Cork (1699–1758), painter and wife of Richard Boyle, 3rd Earl of Burlington
- George Savile, 1st Marquess of Halifax (1633–1695)
- George Savile (disambiguation), for others of that name
- Henry Savile (died 1558), MP for Yorkshire
- Henry Savile (died 1569), MP for Yorkshire and Grantham
- Henry Savile (Bible translator) (1549–1622)
- Henry Savile (politician) (1642–1687)
- Jimmy Savile (1926–2011), DJ, presenter and media personality
- John Savile, 1st Baron Savile of Pontefract (1556–1630), politician; M.P., Lincolnshire and Yorkshire
- John Savile, 1st Baron Savile (second creation) (1818–1896), British diplomat; Ambassador to Italy, 1883–1888
- Leopold Halliday Savile (1870–1953), British civil engineer
- Steven Savile (born 1969), a British fantasy, horror and thriller writer, and editor living in Stockholm, Sweden
- William Savile, 2nd Marquess of Halifax (1665–1700)

== See also ==
- Baron Savile
- Savile Club
- Savile Row
- Savile Town
- Savill (surname)
- Saville (disambiguation)
- Savills
- Seville
