= Nebria lafresnayei =

Scientific classification
- Domain: Eukaryota
- Kingdom: Animalia
- Phylum: Arthropoda
- Class: Insecta
- Order: Coleoptera
- Suborder: Adephaga
- Family: Carabidae
- Genus: Nebria
- Species: N. lafresnayei

Binomial name
- Nebria lafresnayei Audinet-Serville, 1821

Synonyms
- Nebria ferruginipes Pic 1903; Nebria nigripes Pic 1925; Nebria nouei Pic 1932; Nebria schuleri J. Jacquet 1936

Species of beetle

Nebria lafresnayei is a 24 millimetres (0.94 in) long (but can be as small as 12–14 millimetres (0.47–0.55 in)) species of ground beetle in the Nebriinae subfamily that can be found in Cantabrian Mountains of Andorra, France, and in Serville commune of Spain.

== Subspecies ==
The species have 2 subspecies that could be found in Andorra, France, and Spain:

- Nebria lafresnayei cantabrica Bruneau de Mire, 1964 Spain
- Nebria lafresnayei lafresnayei Audinet-Serville, 1821 Andorra, France, Spain
