= Savill (surname) =

Savill is an English language surname. People with this name include:

- Al Savill (1917–1989), US banker and hotel owner;
- Alfred Savill (1829–1905), founder of Savills, a UK company;
- Christian Savill (born 1970), English musician;
- Craig Savill (born 1978), Canadian curler;
- Harriet Elizabeth Savill (1789–1857), English actress, wife of John Faucit;
- J. E. Savill (c. 1847–1920) racehorse owner and trainer in South Australia;
- John Faucit Saville or Savill, (1783?–1853), English actor and theatre manager, husband of Harriet;
- John Savill (born 1957), UK higher education administrator;
- Leonard Savill (1869–1959), Anglican clergyman;
- Les Savill (born 1935), English cricketer;
- Dame Rosalind Savill (1951–2024), British art and museum curator;
- Tom Savill (born 1983), English cricketer.

== Other uses ==
- Savill Building in Surrey, England
- Savill Garden in Surrey, England

== See also ==
- Savile
- Saville (disambiguation)
- Savills
- Seville
