= Nebria lafresnayei lafresnayei =

Scientific classification
- Domain: Eukaryota
- Kingdom: Animalia
- Phylum: Arthropoda
- Class: Insecta
- Order: Coleoptera
- Suborder: Adephaga
- Family: Carabidae
- Genus: Nebria
- Species: N. lafresnayei
- Subspecies: N. l. lafresnayei

Trinomial name
- Nebria lafresnayei lafresnayei Audinet-Serville, 1821

Subspecies of beetle

Nebria lafresnayei lafresnayei is a subspecies of beetle in the family Carabidae that can be found in Andorra, France, and Spain.
