= Nebria lafresnayei cantabrica =

Scientific classification
- Kingdom: Animalia
- Phylum: Arthropoda
- Class: Insecta
- Order: Coleoptera
- Suborder: Adephaga
- Family: Carabidae
- Genus: Nebria
- Species: N. lafresnayei
- Subspecies: N. l. cantabrica

Trinomial name
- Nebria lafresnayei cantabrica Bruneau de Mire, 1964

Subspecies of beetle

Nebria lafresnayei cantabrica is a subspecies of ground beetle in the Nebriinae subfamily that is endemic to Spain.
