= Cadillac High Technology engine =

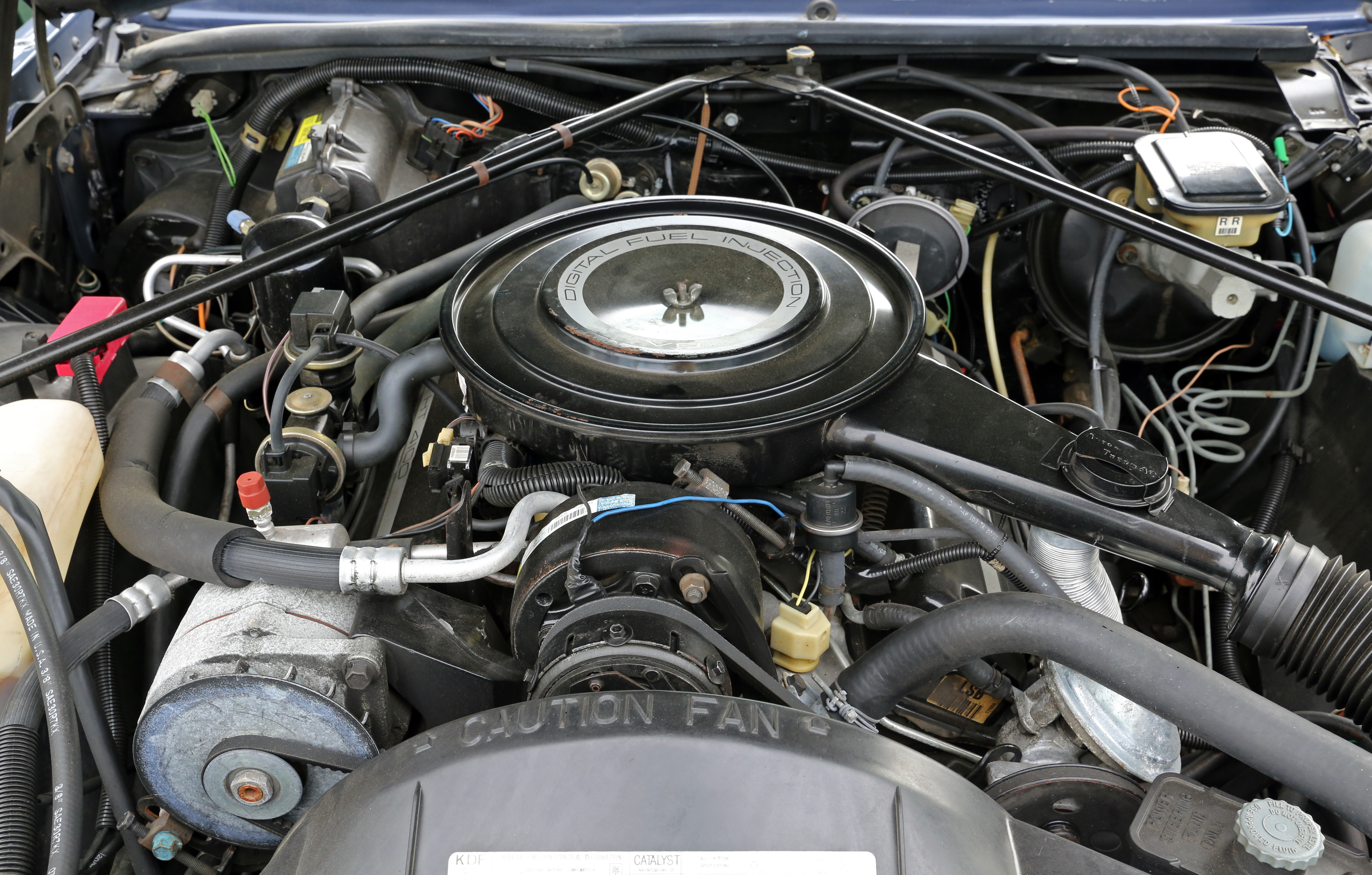

Overview
- Manufacturer: Cadillac
- Production: 1982–1995

Layout
- Configuration: 90° V8
- Displacement: 4.1 L; 249.4 cu in (4,087 cc); 4.5 L; 272.6 cu in (4,467 cc); 4.9 L; 298.6 cu in (4,893 cc)
- Cylinder bore: 88 mm (3.465 in); 92 mm (3.622 in)
- Piston stroke: 84 mm (3.307 in); 92 mm (3.622 in)
- Cylinder block material: Aluminum
- Cylinder head material: Cast iron
- Valvetrain: OHV 2 valves per cylinder
- Compression ratio: 9.5:1

Combustion
- Fuel system: Throttle-body fuel injection; Multiport fuel injection
- Management: Electronic control module (ECM)
- Fuel type: Gasoline
- Oil system: Wet sump
- Cooling system: Water-cooled

Output
- Power output: 135 hp (101 kW) (4.1L); 155 hp (116 kW) (TBI 4.5L); 170 hp (127 kW) (Allanté 4.1L); 180 hp (134 kW) (PFI 4.5L); 200 hp (149 kW)(4.9L & Allanté 4.5L)
- Torque output: 190 lb⋅ft (258 N⋅m) ( 4.1L); 235 lb⋅ft (319 N⋅m) (Allanté 4.1L); 245 lb⋅ft (332 N⋅m) (4.5L); 270 lb⋅ft (366 N⋅m) (Allanté 4.5L); 275 lb⋅ft (373 N⋅m) ( 4.9L)

Chronology
- Predecessor: Cadillac V8-6-4 engine
- Successor: Cadillac Northstar engine

The Cadillac High Technology Engine was a V8 engine produced by the Cadillac division of General Motors from 1982 to 1995.

While the High Technology engine was being developed, due to higher Corporate Average Fuel Economy standards being phased in by the United States government, Cadillac introduced a variant of their traditional V8 engine with the first usage of cylinder deactivation for 1981 as a stopgap measure to increase the fuel economy of their lineup.

However, the V8-6-4 engine experienced problems in reliability related to cylinder deactivation. GM released EPROM updates hoping to increase drivability and reliability, but could not overcome the primitive state of engine control technologies at the time, and the V8-6-4 was discontinued for 1982, with many owners disconnecting the cylinder deactivation system. Cadillac, who planned to introduce their new engine in a line of front-wheel drive models for 1983, was then forced to rush development and production of the High Technology engine for a 1982 introduction in their current rear-wheel drive models.

For nearly 25 years, the High Technology V8 line was known as the last engine family exclusive to the Cadillac Motor Car Division because its successor, the Northstar, would go on to share its architecture with the Oldsmobile Aurora in 1994 and later with flagship Pontiac and Buick models, such as the Pontiac Bonneville and Buick Lucerne. However, in 2019, the Cadillac Blackwing V8 became the new holder of that title.

== HT-4100 ==
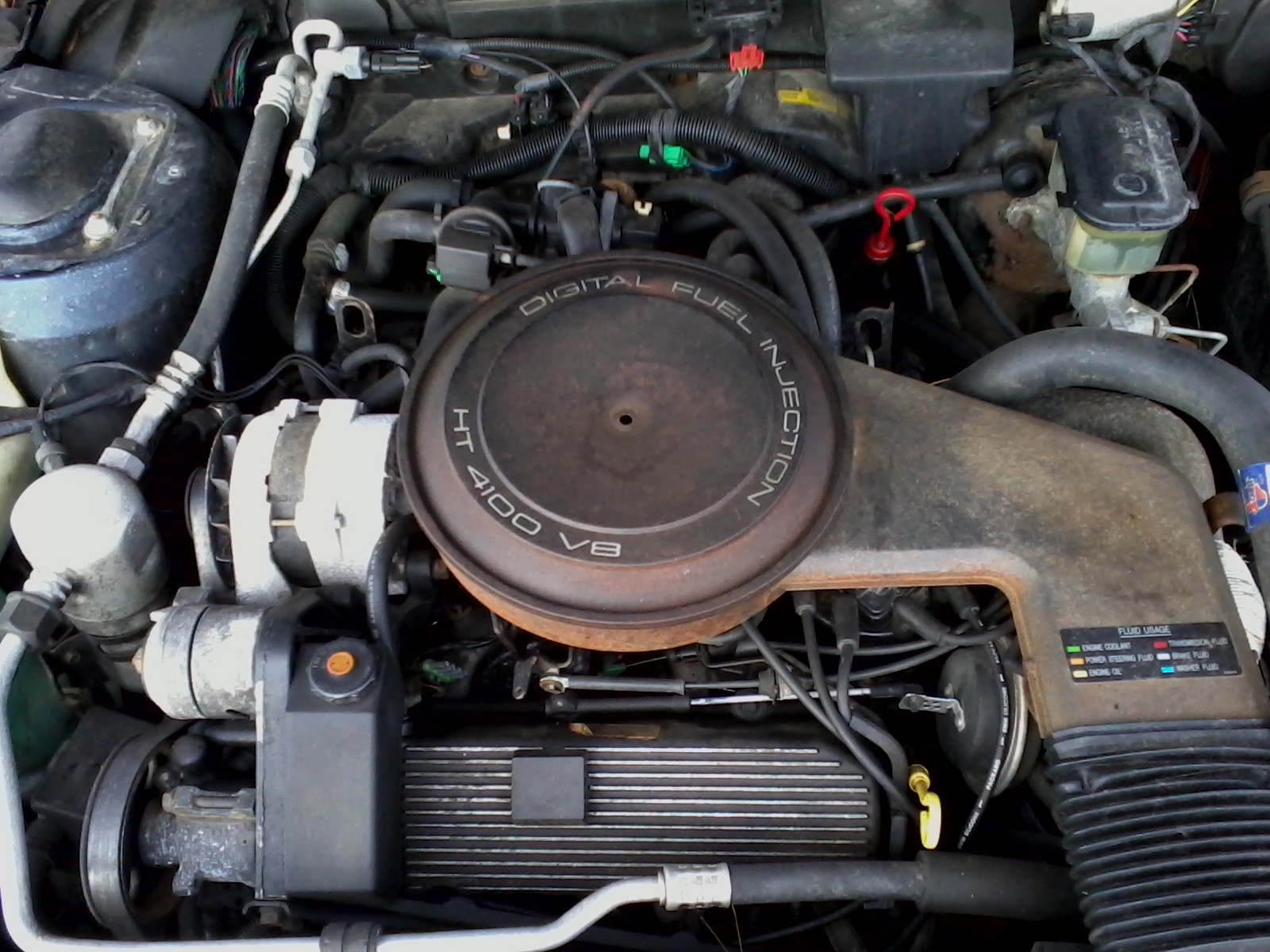
Cadillac 4.1 L engine

A new lighter V8 engine was rushed into production for 1982, the HT-4100 (option code LT8). It was a 4100 cc V8, designed for rear-wheel drive and longitudinal front-wheel drive applications sharing the same transmission bellhousing pattern as Buick, Oldsmobile, and Pontiac engine equipped rear wheel drive vehicles. A new line of downsized Cadillacs with the transverse mounted V8 engine and front wheel-drive was slated for launch in 1983, however, delays in the downsizing program shared with Buick and Oldsmobile postponed their debut until mid 1984 when they were introduced as early 1985 models and shared what is known as the "Metric" bellhousing pattern.

=== Design features ===
HT stood for High Technology. For its time, the engine and its electronic control module (ECM) were quite sophisticated, despite having a throttle-body fuel injection system (as opposed to more advanced multiport fuel injection). Like the 6.0/368" DFI engines before it, the HT4100 used an ECM that incorporated a detailed on-board computer. Every parameter of engine performance could be displayed on the electronic climate control panel while the car was being driven. The HT4100 also adopted other modern design features including replaceable cylinder sleeves, high operating temperature for emission control (210 degrees, compared to 180 in earlier engines), free circulation of coolant between the block and the heads, and bimetal construction that mounted heat-tolerant cast-iron heads onto a weight-saving aluminum block. The engine had a bore and stroke of 88 mm × 84 mm (3.465 in × 3.307 in), for a total displacement of 4.1 L; 249.4 cu in (4,087 cc). It produced 135 hp (101 kW) at 4400 rpm and 190 lb⋅ft (258 N⋅m) of torque at 2000 rpm.

In 1982, the HT4100 debuted as the standard engine for all Cadillac models except the new compact Cimarron, and the Fleetwood limousines, which continued to carry the variable-displacement V8-6-4 engine until 1984.

The HT4100 was prone to failure of the intake manifold gasket due to scrubbing of the bi-metal interface, aluminum oil pump failure, cam bearing displacement, weak aluminum block castings and bolts pulling the aluminum threads from the block. It may not have been the most successful engine to sit under the hood of a Cadillac, but potential buyers were no more satisfied with the other two engines available at the time, the V8-6-4 and the Oldsmobile 5.7 L Diesel. Reliability issues soiled the reputation of the HT4100. As a result, the Oldsmobile V8 gas engines were a popular and straightforward conversion. Despite problems with the engines, Cadillac still had annual sales in the United States above 300,000 as late as 1986.

In 1987, a unique, more powerful engine was introduced in the Cadillac Allanté based on the same architecture. The Allanté 4.1 had a new, reinforced engine block that would later be used in the Cadillac 4.5, it used a different camshaft profile and roller lifters to provide for improved airflow, in addition to multiport fuel injection. This engine was rated at 170 hp (127 kW) at 4300 rpm and 235 lb⋅ft (319 N⋅m) of torque at 3200 rpm. Other than the basic architecture, the only thing the Allanté 4.1 shared with the HT4100 was the displacement, something easily changed in the engine family by simply using different diameter cast-iron cylinder liners.

The 4.1 standard HT 4100 was superseded by improved larger-displacement engines such as the 4.5 and 4.9, and the HT4100 ceased production after the 1987 model year.

=== Applications ===
- 1982–1985 Cadillac Fleetwood Brougham
- 1982–1987 Cadillac DeVille
- 1982–1987 Cadillac Eldorado
- 1982–1987 Cadillac Seville
- 1985–1987 Cadillac Fleetwood
- 1987–1988 Cadillac Allante has the same 4.1 liter displacement, but the block was unique and significantly reinforced, with many significant differences, making it a different engine, more closely related to the 1988-1989 4.5 liter Cadillac engine

== 4.5 ==
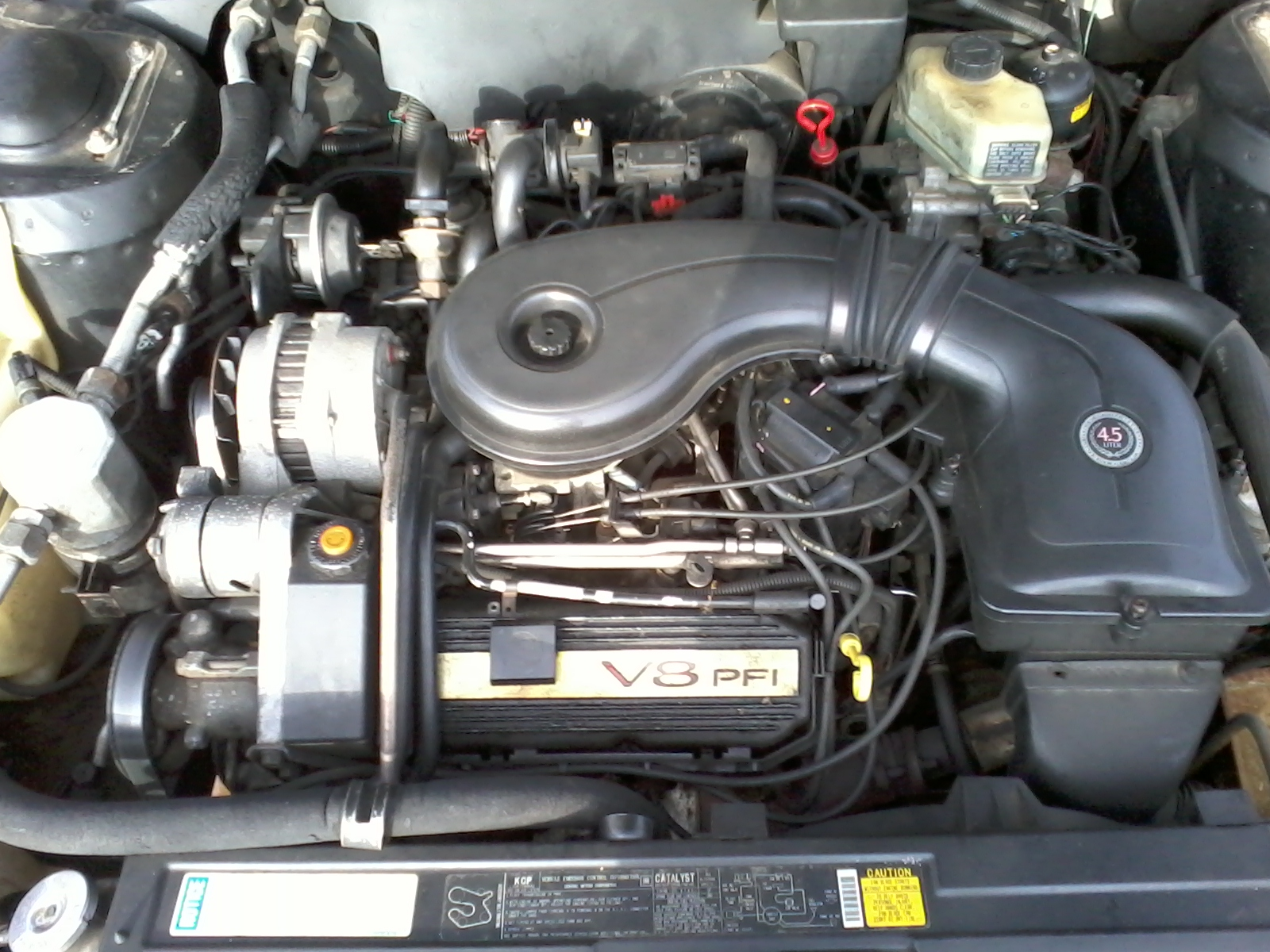
Cadillac 4.5 L engine

The Cadillac 4.5 L engine introduced for the 1988 model year was an improved and enlarged version of the HT4100. However, the 4.5 L engine was never classified as HT4500. Engineering advances allowed the company to begin increasing displacement and output again. A bored-out (to 92 mm (3.62 in)) 4.5 L (273 cu in) 4.5 version was rated 155 hp (116 kW) and featured throttle body fuel injection. There were various versions of this engine built from its introduction in 1988 to the end of production in 1992 including a high-output LW2 version with multi-port fuel injection which produced 200 hp (149 kW) and 270 lb⋅ft (366 N⋅m) for the Allanté. Outside of the Allanté, Cadillac introduced a port fuel-injected 4.5 L V8 engine in 1990 with 180 hp (134 kW) and 245 lb⋅ft (332 N⋅m) across their model line up.

=== Applications ===
This engine was used in the following vehicles:

- 1988–1990 Cadillac DeVille
- 1988–1990 Cadillac Eldorado
- 1988–1990 Cadillac Fleetwood
- 1988–1990 Cadillac Seville
- 1989–1992 Cadillac Allanté

== L26 4.9 ==
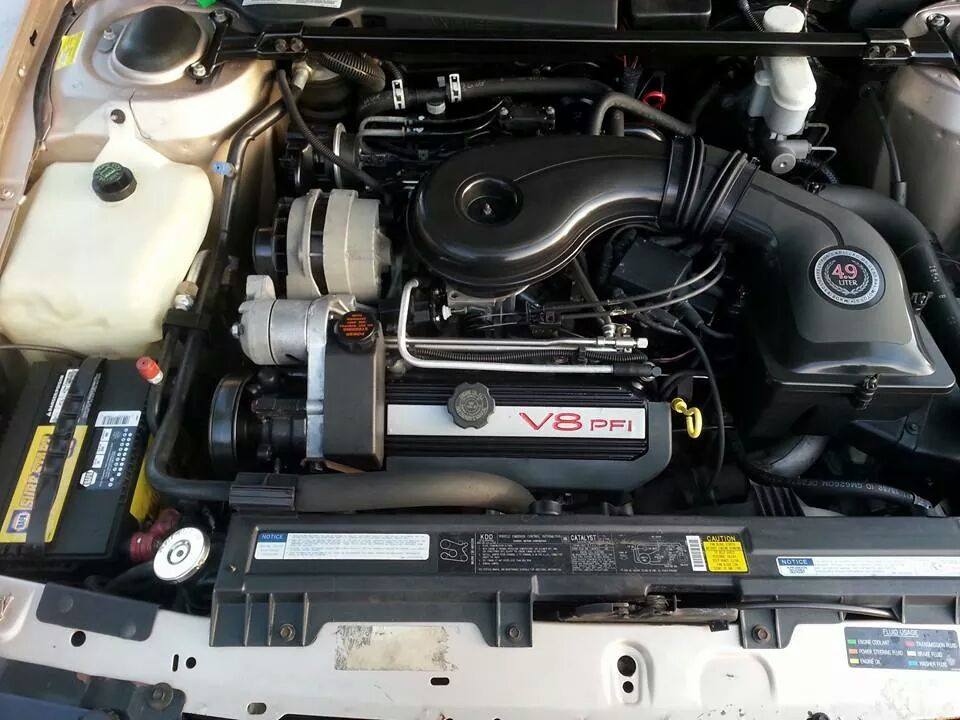
Cadillac 4.9 L engine

A larger version of the 1990 4.5, the L26 4.9, debuted in 1991 at 4.9 L with a square 92 mm (3.62 in) bore and stroke. Despite the fact that it had similar output to the Allanté's 4.5 L port fuel-injected V8, the 4.9 L engine represented a significant upgrade for the remainder of the Cadillac lineup. Horsepower output was up 20 hp (15 kW) from the previous 1990 4.5 L engine and torque was up by 30 lb⋅ft (41 N⋅m), to 200 hp (149 kW) and 275 lb⋅ft (373 N⋅m) respectively. Both the 4.9 and 1990 4.5 port fuel-injected engines required premium fuel due to a 9.5:1 compression ratio. The 4.9 produces its maximum horsepower at 4100 rpm.

The 4.9 L was used throughout the Cadillac line and was last available in the 1995 DeVille. The 4.9 was replaced by the new 4.6-liter Cadillac Northstar engine.

=== Applications ===
The 4.9 L engine was used in the following Cadillacs:

- 1991–1992 Cadillac Fleetwood
- 1991–1993 Cadillac Eldorado
- 1991–1993 Cadillac Seville
- 1991–1995 Cadillac DeVille (base trim only in 1994 and 1995)
- 1991–1993 Cadillac Sixty Special
