= George Savile (cricketer) =

English cricketer

Personal information
- Born: 26 April 1847; Methley, Leeds, Yorkshire, England
- Died: 4 September 1904 (aged 57); Tetbury, Gloucestershire, England
- Height: 5 ft 10 in (1.78 m)
- Batting: Right-handed
- Role: Batsman, occasional wicket-keeper
- Relatives: Arthur Savile (uncle)

Domestic team information
- Years: Team
- 1867–1868: Cambridge University
- 1867–1874: Yorkshire
- 1871–72: Canterbury

Career statistics
Competition	First-class
Matches	16
Runs scored	529
Batting average	23.00
100s/50s	1/3
Top score	105
Catches/stumpings	10/1
- Source: Cricinfo, 2 November 2020

George Savile (26 April 1847 – 4 September 1904) was an English amateur first-class cricketer, who played 16 first-class matches: ten for Cambridge University from 1867 to 1868, five for Yorkshire from 1867 to 1874, and one for Canterbury in New Zealand in 1871/72.

Born in Methley, Leeds, Yorkshire, where his father was rector, Savile was educated at Rossall School (1863 to 1866) and Magdalene College, Cambridge, where he won his cricket Blue in 1868. He was a right-handed batsman who scored 529 first-class runs at an average of 23.00, with his only century, 105 coming for Cambridge University against the MCC in 1868. He opened the batting for Yorkshire against Lancashire later in the 1868 season and made the top score of the match, 65, when Lancashire in their two innings made only 30 and 34.

During a brief stay in New Zealand, Savile played one first-class match for Canterbury against Otago in their ninth annual contest in December 1871. He made the highest score of the match, 58, and took four catches keeping wicket. It was only the second fifty in New Zealand first-class cricket. A local paper said "a finer innings [had] never been played in the interprovincial match". In 1874, while playing in a match in Hertfordshire, he hit a ball 135 yards.

Savile died in September 1904, in Tetbury, Gloucestershire. He had been a complete invalid for several years. His uncle, Arthur Savile, played six first-class games in England between 1839 and 1841.
