= George Savile =

George Savile or Saville may refer to:

- Sir George Savile, 1st Baronet (1551–1622), MP for Yorkshire and Boroughbridge
- George Savile (c. 1583 – 1614), MP for Morpeth (UK Parliament constituency) and Appleby
- Sir George Savile, 7th Baronet (1679–1743), English politician
- Sir George Savile, 8th Baronet (1726–1784), English politician
- George Savile, 1st Marquess of Halifax (1633–1695), English statesman, writer, and politician
- George Savile (cricketer) (1847–1904), cricketer
- George Saville (born 1993), footballer for Millwall and Northern Ireland
- George Savile Foljambe (1800–1869), British aristocrat
