= Serville =

Serville may refer to:

- Serville, Eure-et-Loir, France, a commune
- Serville Poblete, Canadian screenwriter and film director
- Gabriel Serville (1959–2026), politician in French Guiana

== See also ==
- Daubeuf-Serville, commune in Seine-Maritime, France
- Eurytides serville, species of butterfly
- Jean Guillaume Audinet-Serville, French entomologist
- Sevierville, Tennessee, United States, a city
- Servile (disambiguation)
- Seville (disambiguation)
