= Cadillac Seville =

American mid-size luxury sedan

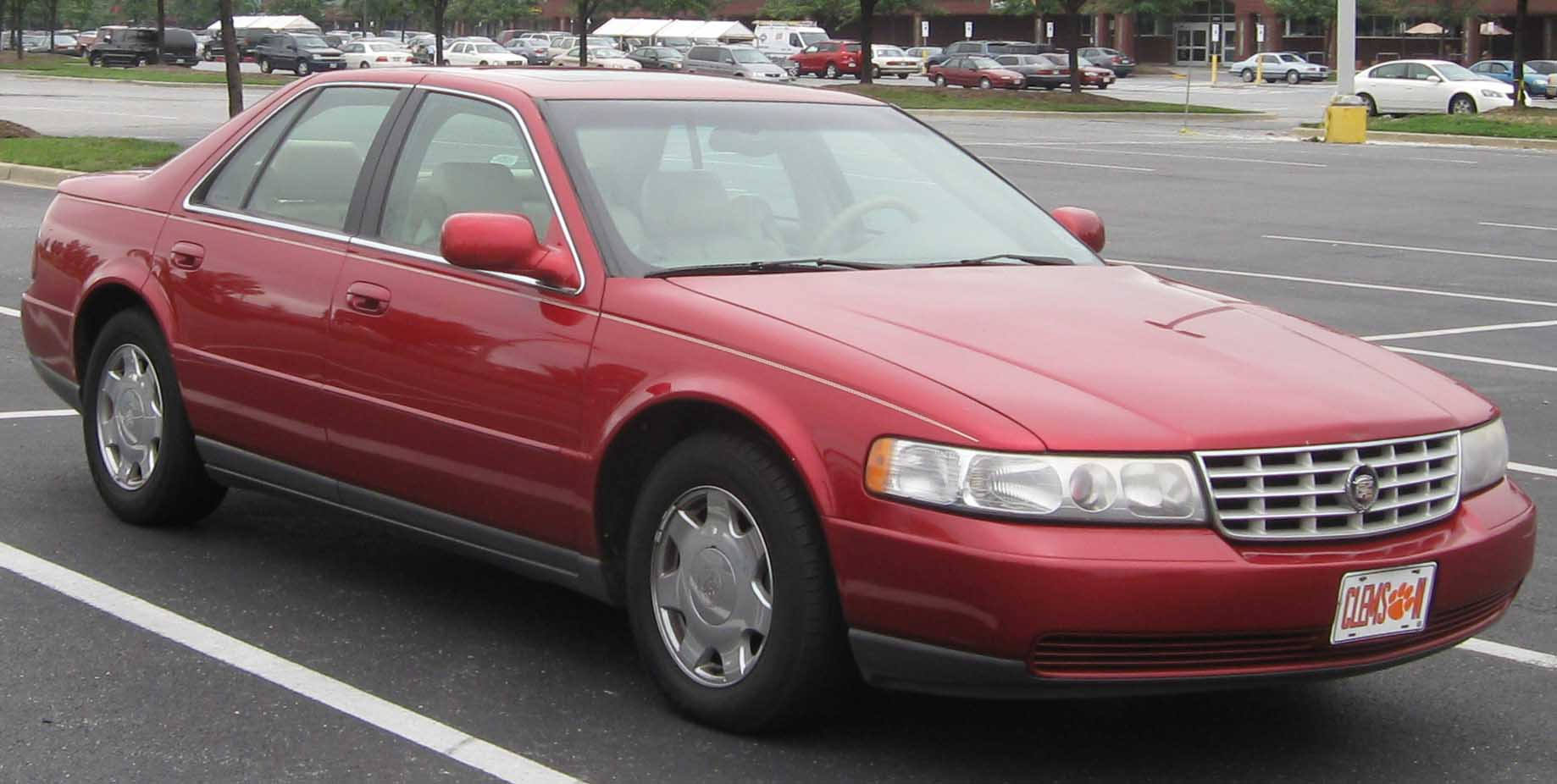
- 1998–2004 Cadillac Seville

Overview
- Manufacturer: Cadillac (General Motors)
- Production: 1975–2003
- Model years: 1976–2004

Body and chassis
- Class: Mid-size luxury car
- Layout: FR layout (1976–1979); Longitudinal front-engine, front-wheel drive (1980–1985); Transverse front-engine, front-wheel drive (1986–2004)

Chronology
- Predecessor: Cadillac Calais
- Successor: Cadillac STS

The Cadillac Seville is a mid-size luxury car manufactured and marketed by General Motors under the Cadillac brand from the 1976 to 2004 model years as a smaller-sized, premium model. It was replaced by the STS in 2004 for the 2005 model year.

== Origin of the name ==
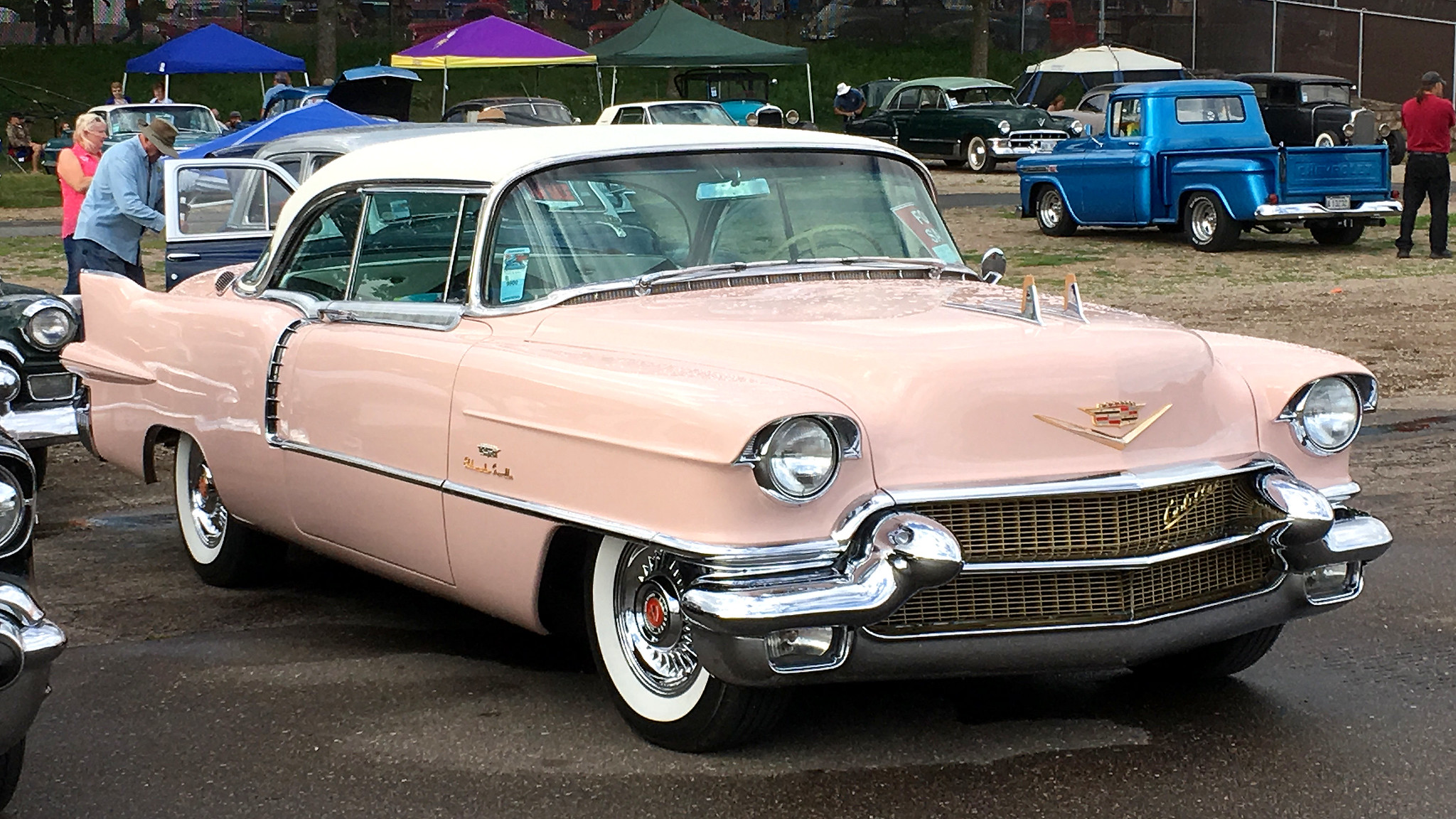
1956 Cadillac Eldorado Seville

The name of "Cadillac's first small car" was selected over a revival of LaSalle or the GM design staff's preference, LaScala, primarily because, according to GM marketing director Gordon Horsburgh, "It had no negatives." The initial suggestion was "Leland", after Cadillac co-founder Henry M. Leland, but it was rejected because most buyers wouldn't understand the reference, and Leland had also co-founded Cadillac's rival company Lincoln.

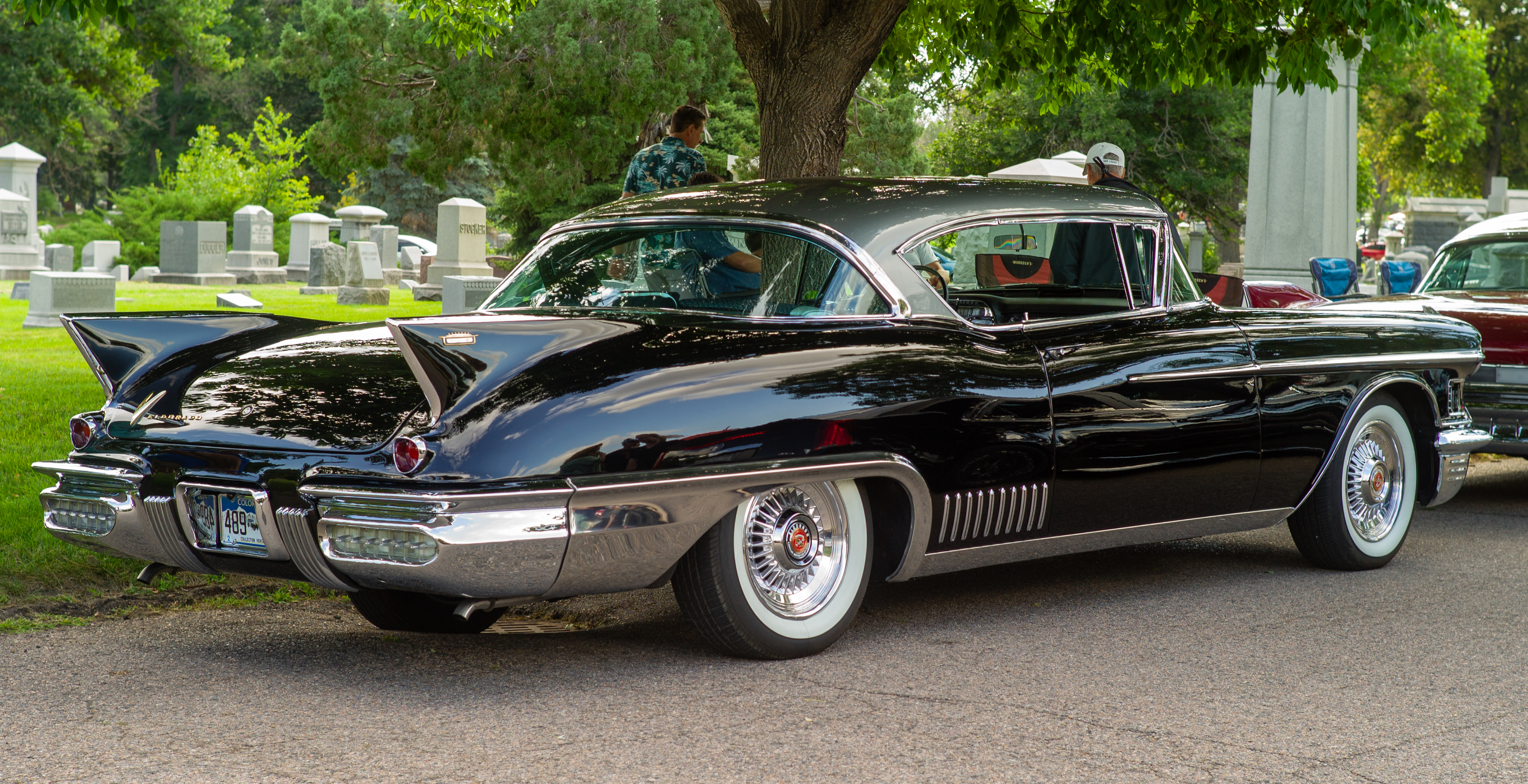
1958 Cadillac Eldorado Seville

Hundreds of suggestions were considered: after extensive research, LaSalle was the top pick, with St. Moritz a distant second, trailed further by Seville. A troubled past (LaSalle) and difficult pronunciation (St. Moritz) led to the eventual selection of the Seville nameplate. Seville is the name of a Spanish province and its capital, renowned for its history and treasures of art and architecture. Cadillac had first used the nameplate for a two-door hardtop version of the 1956 Eldorado. 1960 was the last model year for the Eldorado Seville.

== First generation (1976–1979) ==
First generation
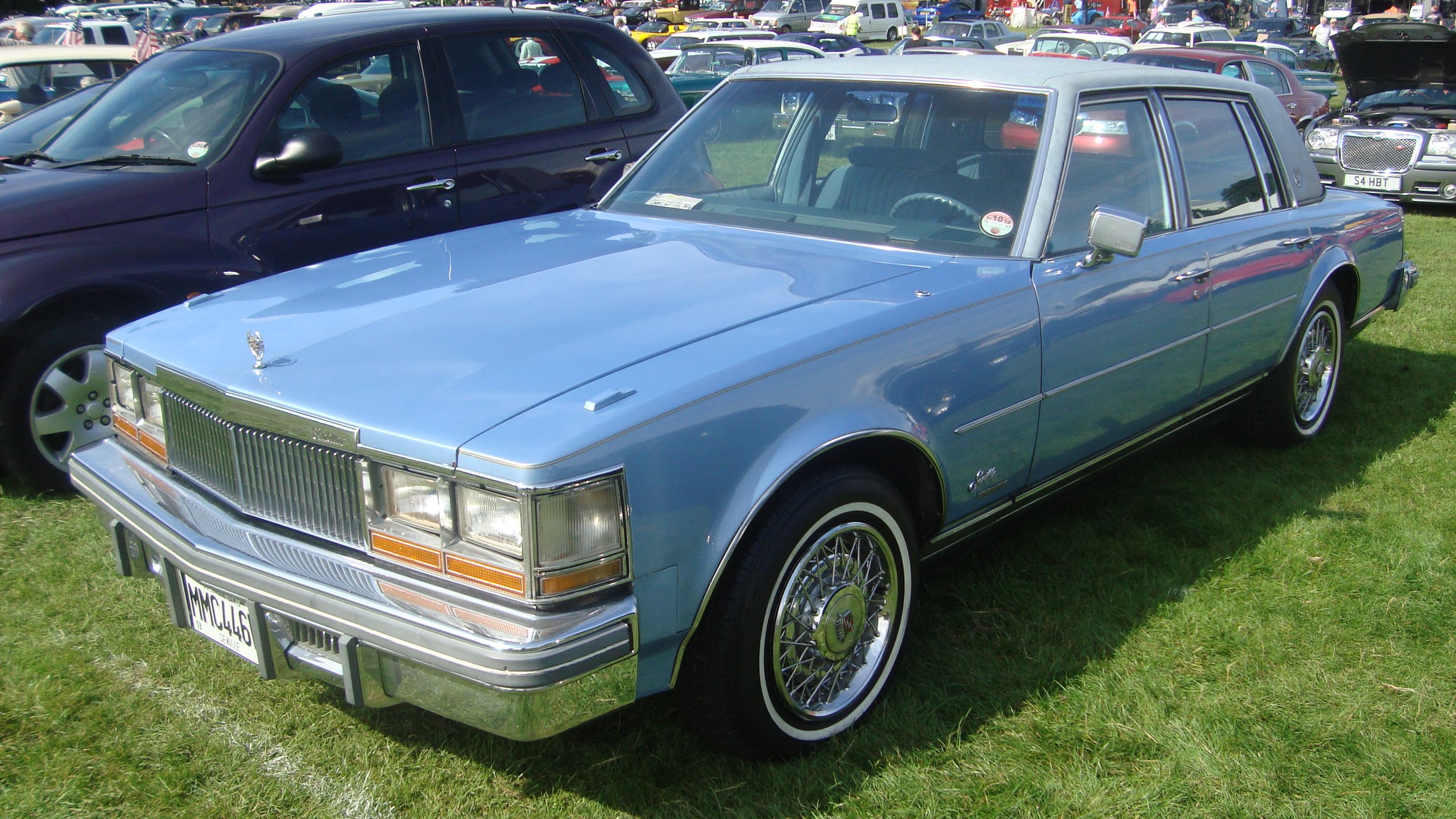

Overview
- Also called: Cadillac Iran
- Production: May 1975–1979; 1977–1987 (Iran)
- Model years: 1976–1979
- Assembly: United States: Detroit, Michigan; Iran: Pars Khodro
- Designer: Bill Mitchell

Body and chassis
- Body style: 4-door sedan
- Layout: FR layout
- Platform: K-body

Powertrain
- Engine: 350 cu in (5.7 L) Oldsmobile V8; 350 cu in (5.7 L) Oldsmobile diesel V8
- Transmission: 3-speed TH-400 Turbo-Hydramatic automatic

Dimensions
- Wheelbase: 114.3 in (2,900 mm)
- Length: 204.0 in (5,180 mm)
- Width: 71.8 in (1,820 mm)
- Height: 54.6 in (1,390 mm)
- Curb weight: 1,970 kg (4,340 lb)

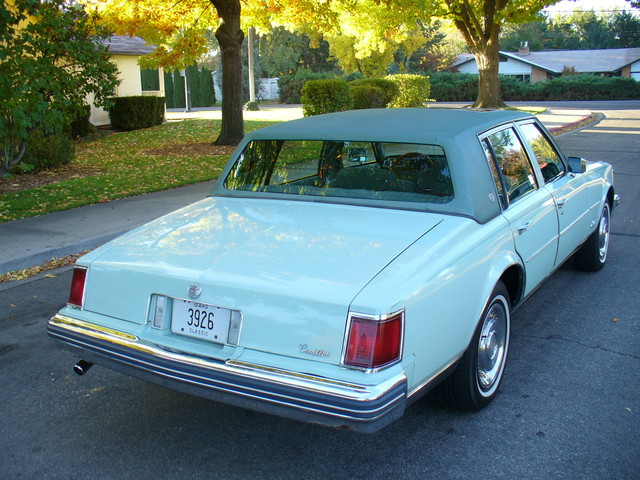
Rear view of 1977 Cadillac Seville

The Seville, introduced in May 1975 as an early 1976 model, was Cadillac's answer to the rising popularity of European luxury imports as Mercedes-Benz, Audi and BMW. GM planners were becoming concerned that the division's once-vaunted image as the "standard of the world" was fading, especially among younger generations of car buyers.

Over time, European luxury cars had become quite luxurious and even more expensive than the much larger Cadillacs. As market share of these imports continued to climb, it became clear that the traditional American automotive paradigm of "bigger equals better" had begun to falter. The Seville became the smallest and most expensive model in the lineup, turning Cadillac's traditional marketing and pricing strategy upside down. Full-size design prototypes were created as early as winter of 1972–73 (wearing the tentative name LaSalle, reviving the Cadillac junior brand from 1927 to 1940), and subsequent design prototypes looked edgier (specifically a 1973 named LaScala, which forwardly hinted at the 1992 Seville).

Styling took strong cues from the Rolls-Royce Silver Shadow. Cadillac stylists added a crisp, angular body that set the tone for GM styling for the next decade, along with a wide track stance, giving the car a substantial, premium appearance. A wide chrome grille flanked by quadruple rectangular headlamps with narrow parking and signal lamps just below the header panel, while small wrap-around rectangular tail lamps placed at the outermost corners of the rear gave the appearance of a lower, leaner, and wider car. The taillight design was similar to that used on a rejected Coupe DeVille concept.

Unibody construction included a bolt-on subframe with a rear suspension based on the rear-wheel drive 1968–74 X-body platform that underpinned a range of compact GM cars. It also featured a rear differential with thicker front subframe bushings similar to the second generation F platform used in the Chevrolet Camaro, Pontiac Firebird, and the 1975–79 X-body platform. For the substantial re-engineering and upgrades from the X platform, it was given the unique designation "K-body". Also shared with the X-body platform was part of the roof stamping and trunk floor pan (for 1975 and newer vehicles).

Seville engineers chose the X-body platform instead of the originally intended Opel Diplomat in response to GM's budget restrictions (executives felt re-engineering an Opel would be more costly). Another proposal during development was a front-wheel drive layout similar to the Cadillac Eldorado. This proposal was also rejected because of budget concerns since the transaxle used for the Eldorado was produced on a limited basis solely for the E-body (Eldorado/Toronado) and the GMC motorhome of the mid-1970s.

Introduced in mid-1975 and billed as the new "internationally-sized" Cadillac, the Seville was almost 1,000 pounds (450 kg) lighter than the full-sized Deville. The Seville was thus more nimble and easier to park, in addition to retaining a full complement of Cadillac features. More expensive than any other Cadillac (except the Series 75 Fleetwood factory limousines) at US$12,479 ($74,666 in 2025 dollars), the Seville was successful enough to spawn several imitators, including the unsuccessful Lincoln Versailles and the Chrysler LeBaron (known as the Fifth Avenue after 1982). To ensure the quality of the initial production run, the first 2,000 units produced were identical in color (Georgian silver) and options. This enabled workers to "ramp up" to building different configurations. Total 1976 Seville production was 43,772 vehicles.

Early Sevilles produced between April 1975 (a total of 16,355) to the close of the 1976 model year were the first Cadillacs to use the smaller GM wheel bolt pattern (5 lugs with a 4.75 in (121 mm) bolt circle; the 2003–2009 XLR also uses this pattern). The first Sevilles shared a minority of components with the X-Body. The rear drums measured 11 in (280 mm) and were similar to the ones used with the Nova 9C1 (police option) and A-body (Chevrolet Chevelle, Oldsmobile Cutlass, Buick Regal, Pontiac LeMans) intermediate station wagons. Starting with the 1977 model year, production Sevilles used the larger 5-lug bolt circle common to full-size Chevrolet passenger cars (1971–76), Cadillacs, Buicks, Oldsmobiles, Pontiacs, and half-ton Chevrolet/GMC light trucks and vans. It also received rear disc brakes, a design which would surface a year later as an option on the F-body Pontiac Trans Am. 1975–76 models included a vinyl roof to less expensively cover the roof's two part construction. The rear section around the C-pillar was pressed especially for Cadillac, and X-body pressing was used for the forward section. Due to customer demand, a painted steel roof was offered in 1977, requiring a new full roof stamping. 1977 Seville production increased slightly to 45,060 vehicles. The last year, production increased to the first generation's peak production, at 56,985.

The engine was an Oldsmobile-sourced 350 cu in (5.7 L) V8, fitted with a Bendix analog port fuel injection system. This system gave the Seville smooth drivability and performance that was usually lacking in domestic cars of this early emissions control era. Power output was 180 hp (134 kW), and fuel economy was 15 MPG in the city and 21 MPG on the highway. While standard on Seville, this EFI system was optional on the full size models starting in 1975. Performance was considered good for the era, with 0–60 mph (97 km/h) taking 11.5 seconds. A diesel displacing 350 cu in (5.7 L) LF9 V8 was added in 1978.

For the 1978 and 1979 model years, the Seville offered a trip computer, marketed as "Tripmaster", at an extra cost of $920. The fuel gauge, speedometer and clock were replaced with digital readouts. Gas-discharge display technology was selected due to greater visibility in daylight conditions. A small panel of 12 buttons allowed selection of data to be displayed, such as coolant temp, battery voltage, or fuel range. The driver could also enter initial trip data and the computer would estimate arrival time based on speed and miles remaining. The computer itself was designed around the Motorola 6800 architecture and included self-diagnostics. For the 1979 model year, Tripmaster's hardware was improved, and the option was made available on the newly downsized Eldorado, which shared the same engine and EFI system as the Seville.

The Seville was the first American automobile to offer full electronic instrumentation. Although the 1978 Lincoln Continental Mark V was available with a "Miles-To-Empty" feature (i.e., an LED readout of miles left to travel based on the fuel remaining), Lincoln did not offer full electronic instrumentation until 1980. The Tripmaster proved unpopular due to its high price, but it served successfully as an engineering test bed for future embedded electronics in GM vehicles. For 1980, an integrated LED-based MPG Sentinel display panel became standard equipment, and a VFD digital speedometer cluster was offered as an option starting in 1981.

A number of custom coach builders made modifications to the 1975–1979 Seville, including shortened 2-seat 2-door convertibles, a 2-door convertible with a back seat, a 2-door pickup truck, 2-door coupes, 2- and 4-door lengthened-hood Sevilles with a fake spare tire in each front fender, and a lengthened-wheelbase standard 4-door Seville.

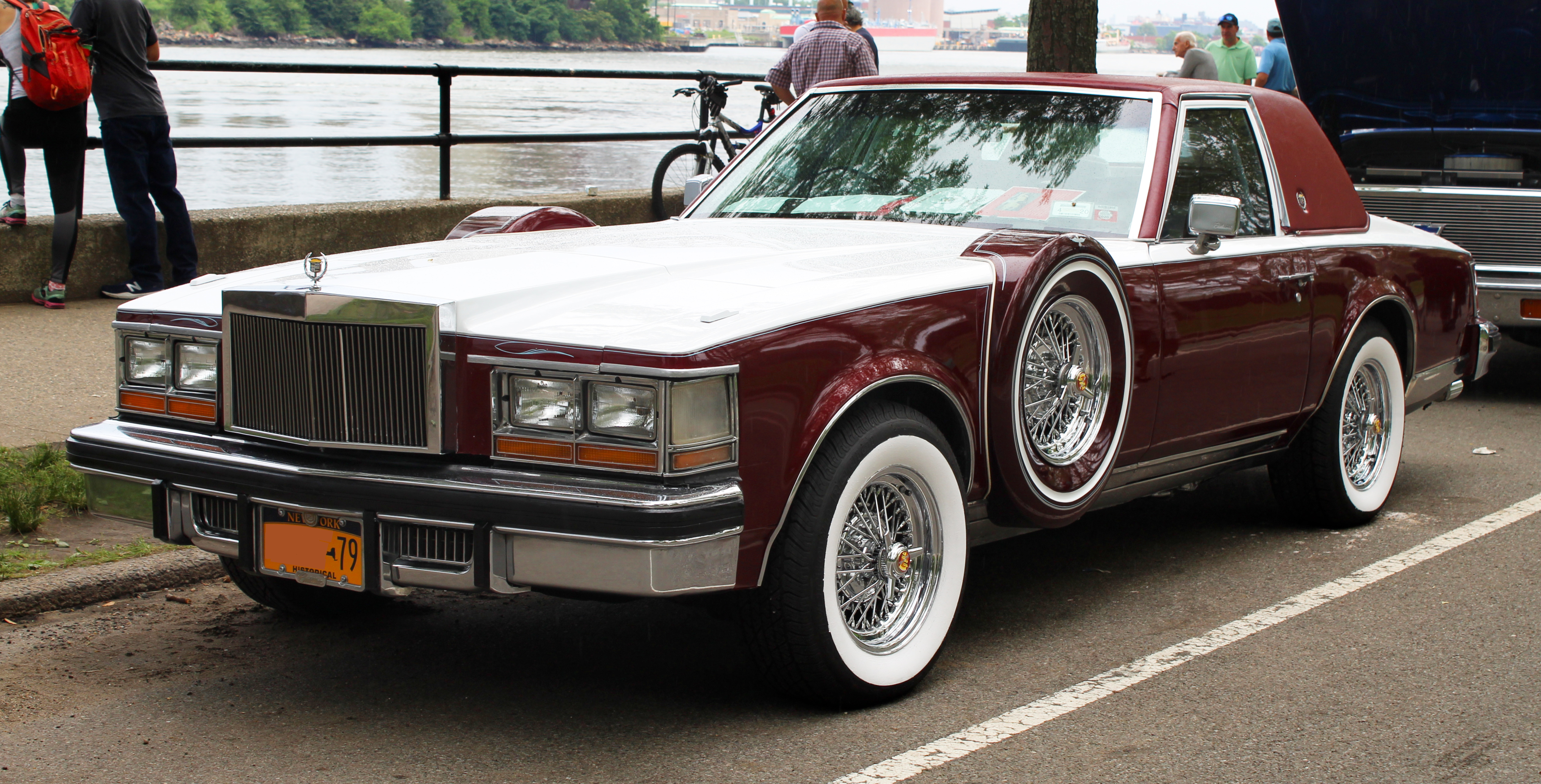
1979 Cadillac Seville Opera Coupe by Grandeur

In the late 1970s, Grandeur Motor Car Company of Florida offered converted Sevilles with neoclassical 1930s styling cues. These sedans were converted mostly into 2-door coupes with an elongated hood, fake spare tire covers on both sides, a small portal window in the rear right section of the vinyl-covered roof, and an upright Lincoln Mark series-style grille. An estimated 600 Seville Opera Coupes were produced.

The Seville was manufactured in Iran under the brand name of "Cadillac Iran" from 1978 to 1987 by Pars Khodro, which was known as "Iran General Motors" before the Islamic Revolution. A total of 2,653 Cadillacs were made in Iran during this period. This made Iran the only country assembling Cadillacs outside the US until 1997, when the Opel Omega-based Catera was built in Germany for US sale. The Cadillac BLS, built in Sweden exclusively for European market, was introduced in 2006. Although the Allanté had an Italian-sourced body and interior, its final assembly was done in the US.

=== Elegante ===
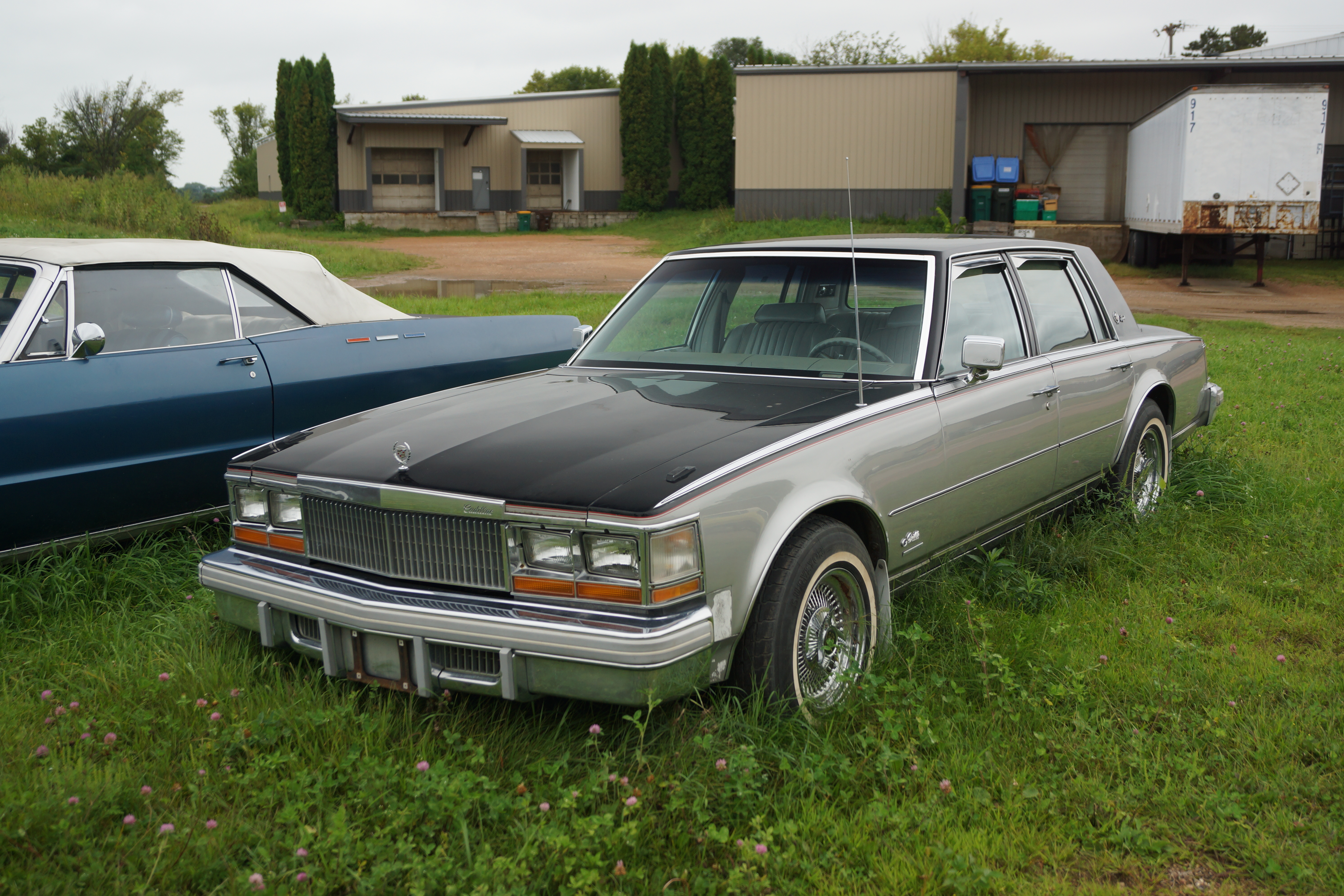
1978 Cadillac Seville Elegante

From 1978 until the third generation in 1988, the Seville was available with the Elegante package. It added a unique black/silver two-tone exterior paint combination and perforated leather seats in light gray only. Real wire wheels were standard as were a host of other features which were optional or unavailable on the base Seville.

In 1979, a second color combination was added, a two-tone copper shade with a matching leather interior. For the second generation Elegante in 1985, a monotone paint combination became available; however, dual-shade combinations, later available in various colors, remained more popular. The price for this package increased over time from $2,600 in 1978 ($12,834 in 2025 dollars) to $4,005 ($11,350 in 2025 dollars) in 1987 in addition to the base price.

=== Production ===
Year	Total
1975	16,355
1976	43,772
1977	45,060
1978	56,985
1979	53,487

=== Engines ===
Year	Engine	Power
1976–1979	5.7 L Oldsmobile V8	180 hp (134 kW)
1978–1979	5.7 L LF9 Diesel V8	105 hp (78 kW)

== Second generation (1980–1985) ==
Second generation
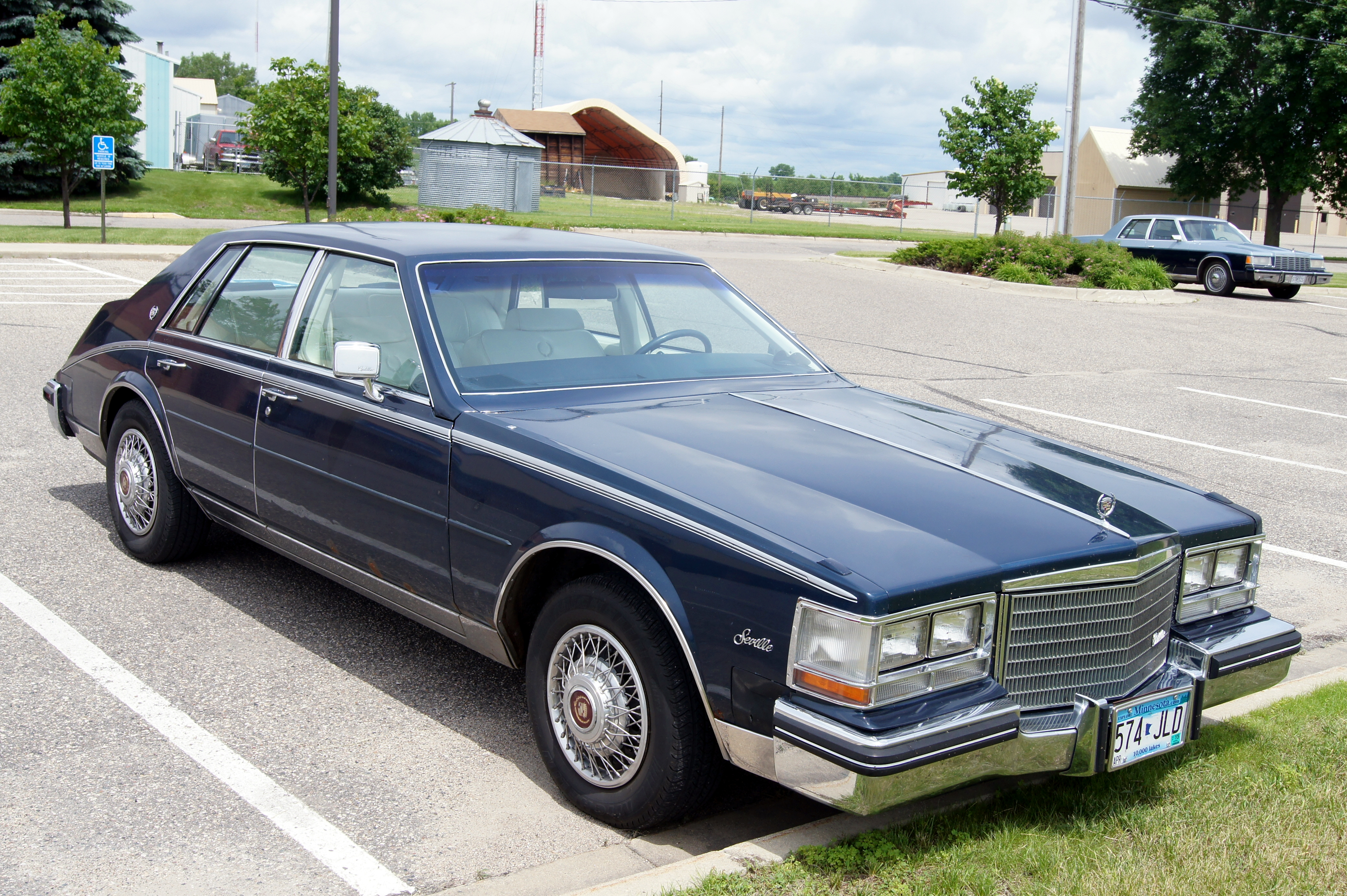

Overview
- Production: 1979–1985
- Assembly: United States: Linden, New Jersey
- Designer: Bill Mitchell

Body and chassis
- Body style: 4-door sedan
- Layout: Longitudinal front-engine, front-wheel drive
- Platform: K-body

Powertrain
- Engine: 1980–85: 5.7 L LF9 105 hp (78 kW) Oldsmobile Diesel V8; 1980: 6.0 L L61 145 hp (108 kW) Cadillac V8; 1980: 5.7 L L49 180 hp (130 kW) Oldsmobile V8; 1981: 6.0 L L62 145 hp (108 kW) Cadillac V8; 1982–85: 4.1 L LT8 135 hp (101 kW) Cadillac V8; 1981–82: 4.1 L LC4 125 hp (93 kW) Buick V6
- Transmission: 4-speed automatic

Dimensions
- Wheelbase: 114.0 in (2,896 mm)
- Length: 204.8 in (5,202 mm)
- Width: 1980–82: 71.4 in (1,814 mm); 1983–85: 70.9 in (1,801 mm)
- Height: 54.3 in (1,379 mm)
- Curb weight: 1,895–2,010 kg (4,178–4,431 lb)

While the first-generation Seville had proved quite successful, it failed in its primary mission of winning over younger import buyers. Marketing research indicated that the car was most popular with older women who wanted a Cadillac in a smaller, more maneuverable size. For the 1980 model year, the Seville's K-body platform became front-wheel drive, based on the E-body Eldorado, Buick Riviera, and Oldsmobile Toronado. Length and wheelbase were similar, with the car losing 0.3 inches in wheelbase and gaining 0.8 inches overall. The new model featured independent rear suspension. The standard engine was the new digitally fuel-injected 368 cu in (6.0 L) Cadillac L62 V8, with the 350 cu in (5.7 L) Oldsmobile diesel carried over from the previous generation available as a no-cost option except in California, where the fuel-injected Oldsmobile 350 was retained for emissions purposes.

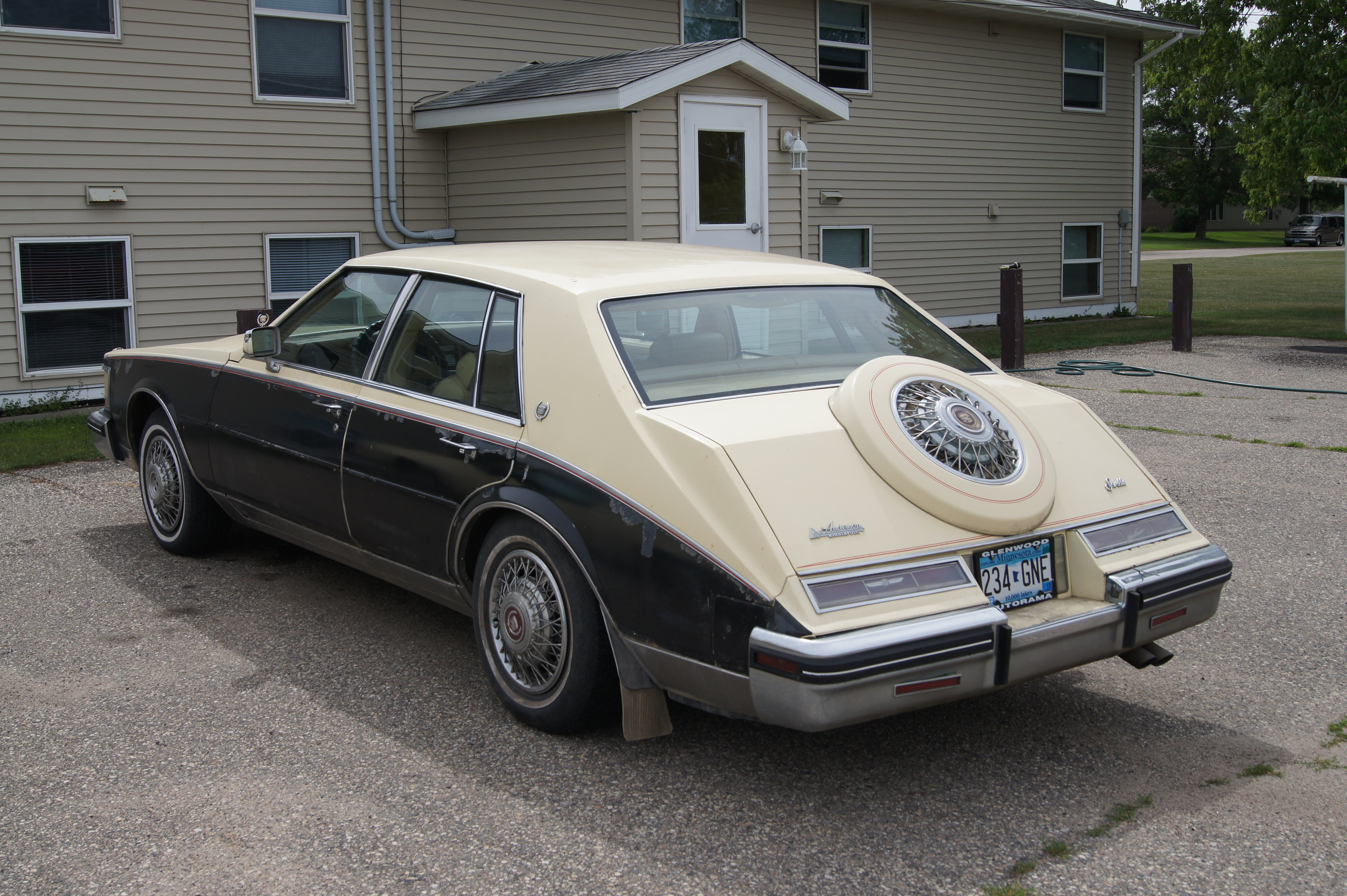
1985 Seville rear, two-tone with aftermarket fake spare wheel feature

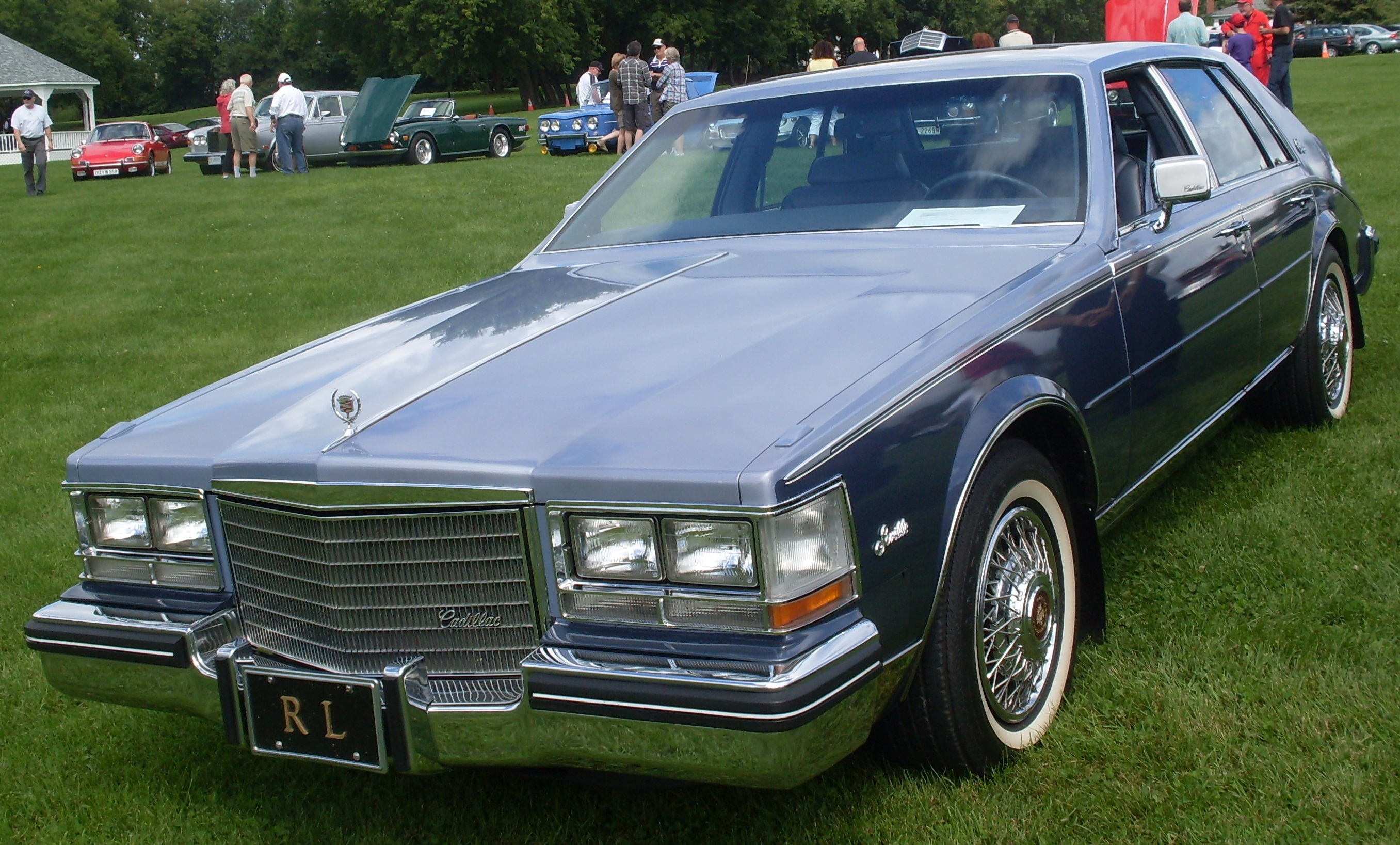
1984 Cadillac Seville (front)

The razor-edged, bustle-back rear styling drew inspiration from English coachbuilder Hooper & Co.'s "Empress Line" designs from the early 1950s, which were considered a dramatic, modern take on the mid-1930s style of trunk/body integration. In addition, long hood/short deck proportions were inspired by luxury cars of the 1960s. The Seville's "statement" bustle-back styling was the ultimate realization of many previous conceptual design efforts by GM designer Wayne Kady. The Seville was also one of the last vehicles designed under the leadership of GM vice president of design Bill Mitchell, a major proponent of the bustle-back design. Bill's immediate predecessor, Harley Earl, had originally appointed Mitchell as Cadillac's first chief designer in 1936. This styling was swiftly imitated by the 1982–87 Lincoln Continental sedan and the 1981–83 Imperial coupe. Sales of the Seville were strong at first, but disastrous flirtation with diesel engines and the ill-fated V-8-6-4 variable displacement gasoline engine, coupled with poor quality control, eroded its standing in the marketplace.

The Seville introduced features that would become traditional in later years. 1981 saw the introduction of memory seats, a feature not seen on a Cadillac since the Eldorado Broughams of the late 1950s. This option allowed two stored positions to be recalled at the touch of a button. Also new for 1981 was a digital instrument cluster shared with the Eldorado. Engine options changed for 1981: the V8 was now equipped with the V8-6-4 variable displacement technology. A carbureted 4.1 L (252 cu in) Buick V6 was added as a credit option. Puncture-sealing tires were also new.

In 1982, Seville offered heated outside rear-view mirrors, available with optional rear defogger. Inside, a "Symphony Sound" stereo cassette tape system was available. The previously standard diesel engine became an option with the introduction of a new 4.1 L (250 cu in) HT-4100. This engine had a number of reliability issues, such as weak, porous aluminum block castings and failure-prone intake manifold gaskets.

For 1983, the Buick V6 was dropped and a new Delco/Bose stereo cassette system was offered at $895. Initially resembling a standard Delco radio, it featured a brushed gold-look front panel and bulbous lower interior door speaker assemblies from 1984 onward. This was also the last year for an available 8-track stereo system. From 1983 through 1985, it was available with a fake cabriolet roof option which gave the appearance of a four-door convertible.

Production Figures:

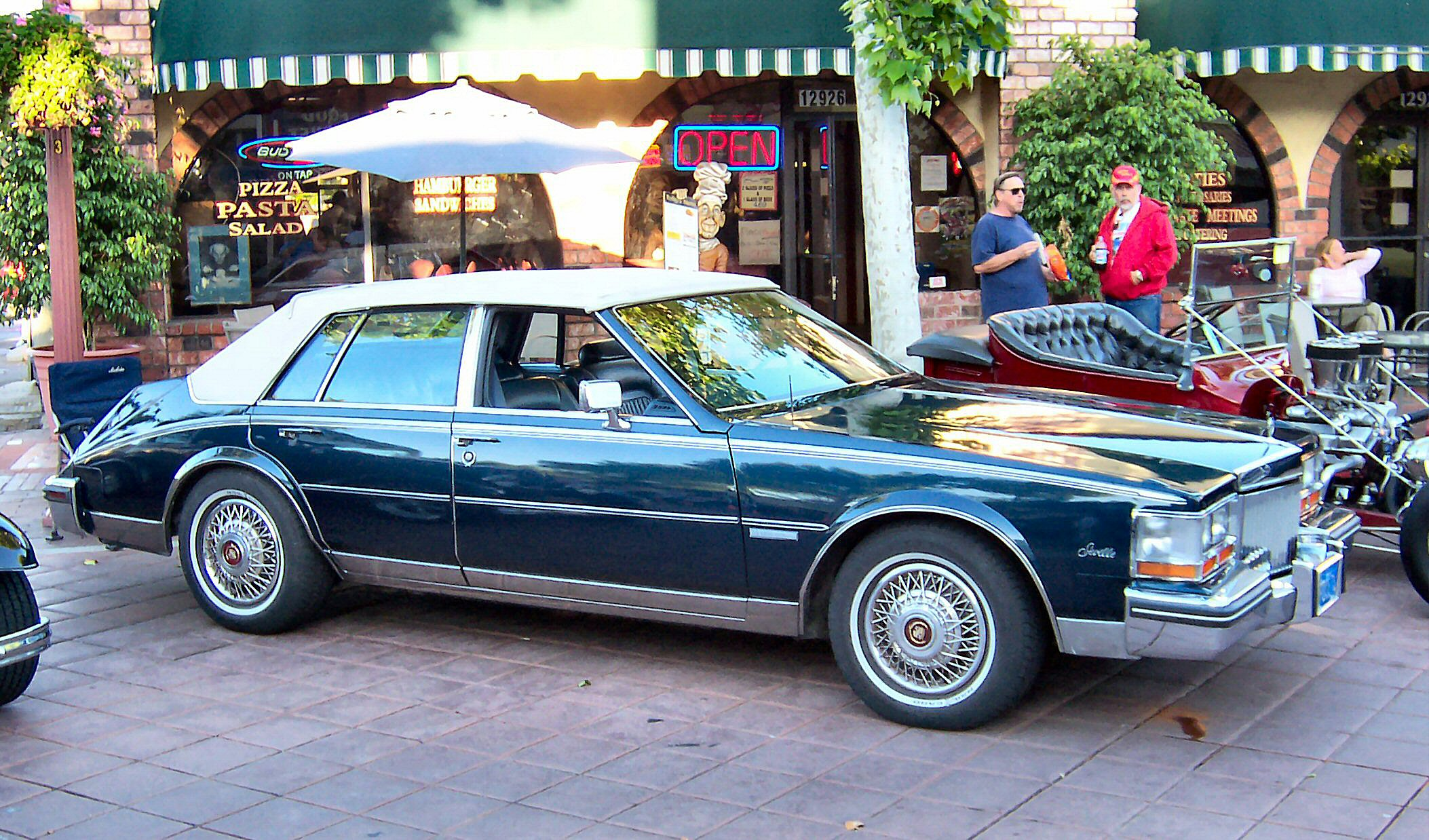
1980 Cadillac Seville

Cadillac Seville Production Figures
	Yearly Total
1980	39,344
1981	28,631
1982	19,998
1983	30,430
1984	39,997
1985	39,755
Total	198,155

=== Engines ===
Year	Engine	Power
1980	6.0 L L61 Cadillac V8	145 hp (108 kW)
1980–1985	5.7 L LF9 Diesel V8	105 hp (78 kW)
1980	5.7 L L49 Oldsmobile V8	180 hp (130 kW)
1981	6.0 L L62 V8-6-4 V8	145 hp (108 kW)
1981–1982	4.1 L LC4 Buick V6	125 hp (93 kW)
1982	4.1 L LT8 HT4100 V8	125 hp (93 kW)
1982–1985	4.1 L LT8 HT4100 V8	135 hp (101 kW)

In 1980, the 350 ci L49 was only available for California.

== Third generation (1986–1991) ==
Third generation
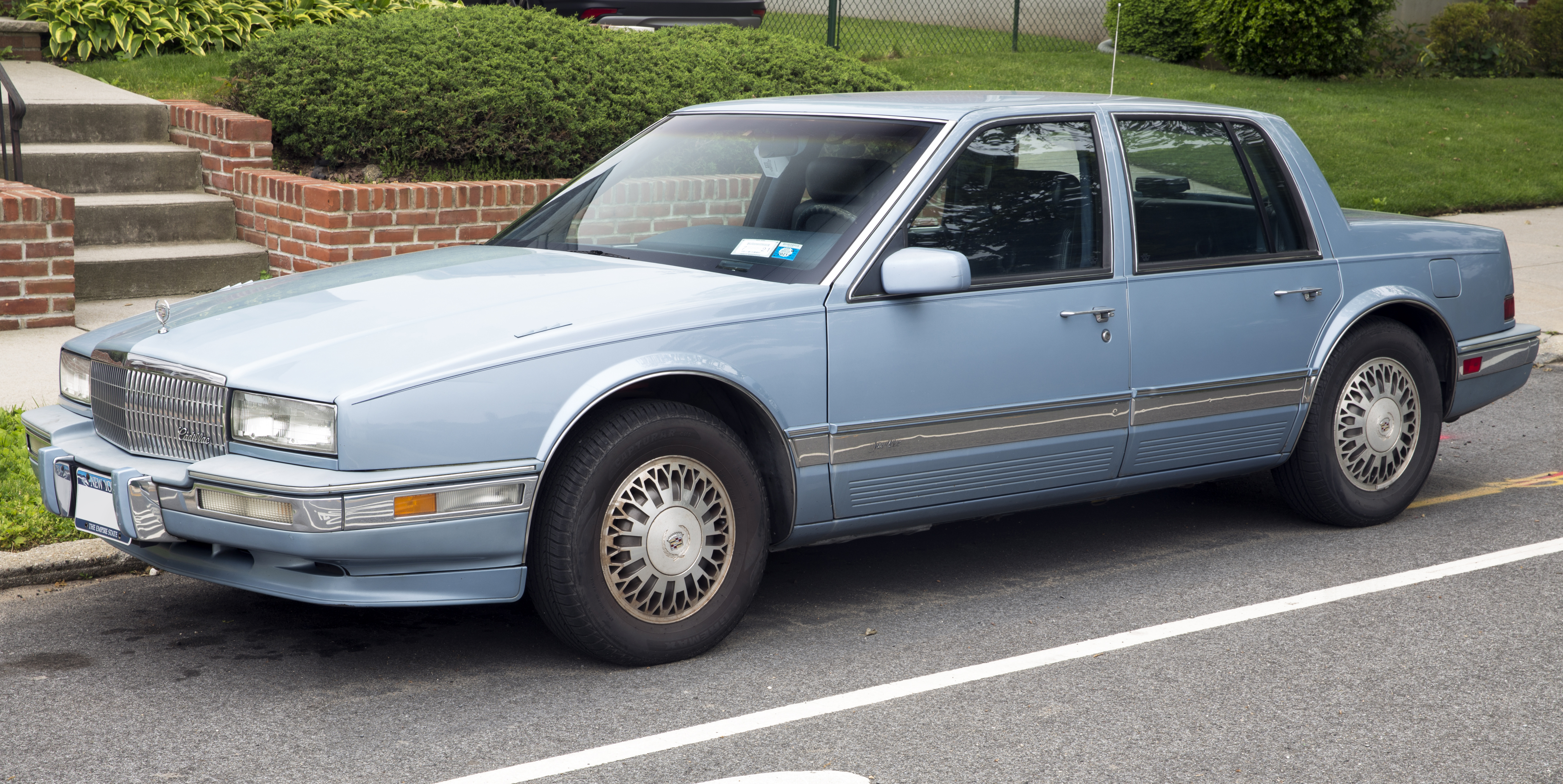

Overview
- Production: 1985–1991
- Assembly: United States: Detroit/Hamtramck Assembly, Hamtramck, Michigan
- Designer: Irv Rybicki (1982)

Body and chassis
- Body style: 4-door sedan
- Layout: Transverse front-engine, front-wheel drive
- Platform: K-body
- Related: Buick Riviera; Cadillac Eldorado; Oldsmobile Toronado

Powertrain
- Engine: 4.1 L LT8 V8; 4.5 L HT4500 V8; 4.5 L LW2 V8; 4.9 L L26 V8
- Transmission: 4-speed automatic

Dimensions
- Wheelbase: 108.0 in (2,743 mm)
- Length: 1986–87: 188.2 in (4,780 mm); 1988–1991: 190.8 in (4,846 mm)
- Width: 1986–89: 70.9 in (1,801 mm); 1990–1991: 72.0 in (1,829 mm)
- Height: 1986–1990: 53.7 in (1,364 mm); 1991: 53.2 in (1,351 mm)
- Curb weight: 1,560–1,750 kg (3,440–3,860 lb)

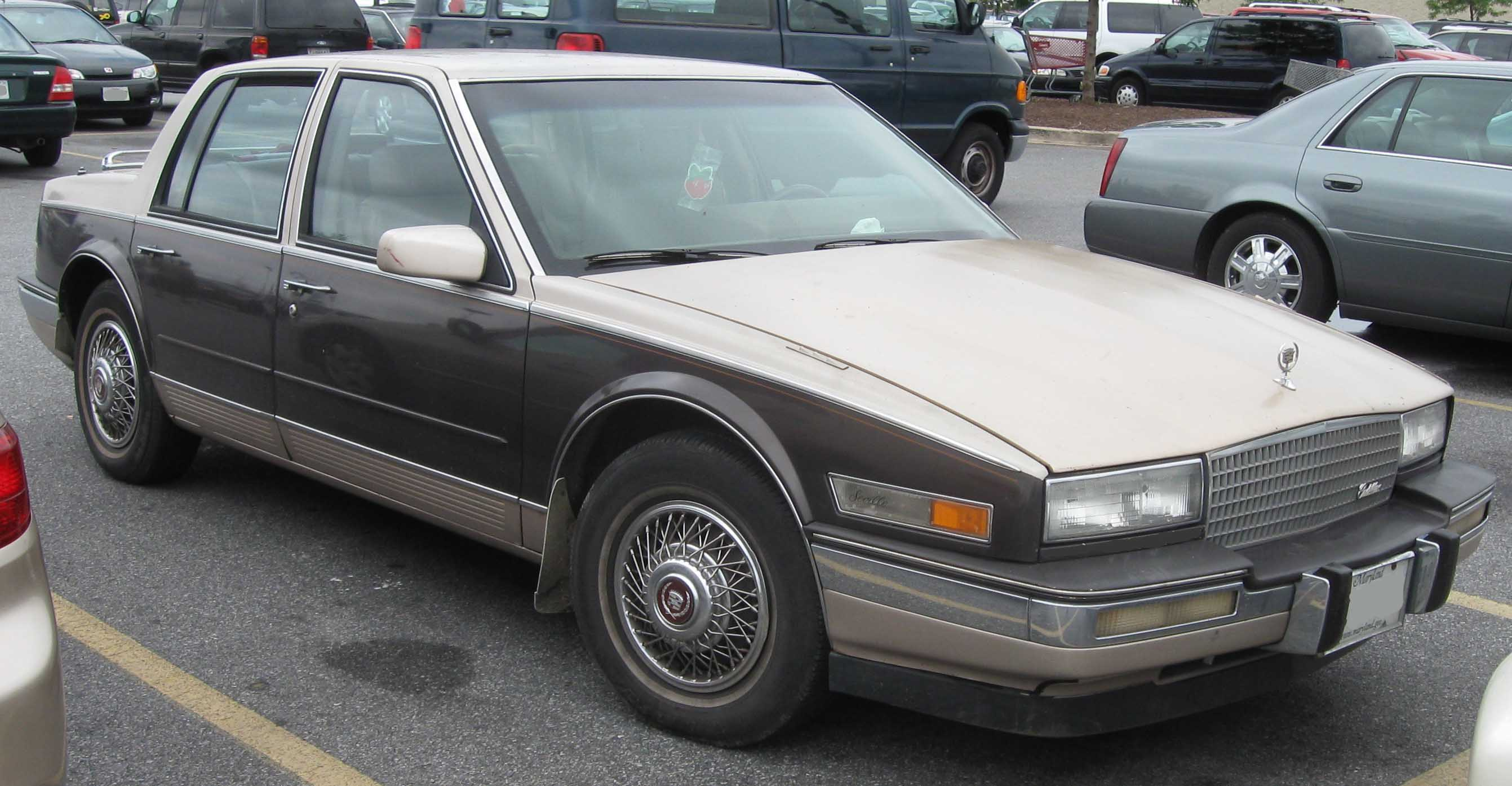
1988 Cadillac Seville

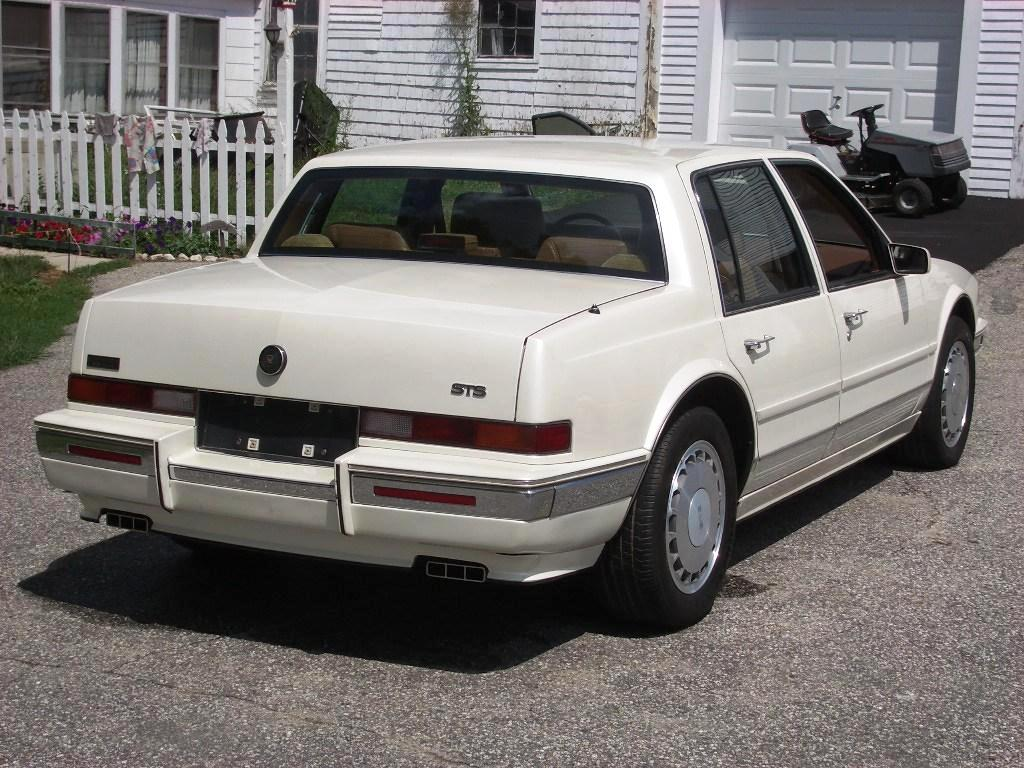
1990 Cadillac Seville STS (rear)

The 1986 Cadillac Seville featured a transverse-mounted V8 driving the front wheels, an advanced 4-speed automatic transmission, and EPA fuel mileage of 26 mpg_{‑US} (9.0 L/100 km; 31 mpg_{‑imp}) on the highway. The Seville's computerized engine management system featured a BCM/ECM (Body Control Module/Engine Control Module) and an electronic dashboard using high-intensity vacuum fluorescent displays — made possible after GM's acquisition of Hughes Electronics.

With sales substantially below expectations, Cadillac facelifted the exterior for the 1988 model year. This was the final generation to have an annual grille facelift. Cadillac introduced the Seville Touring Sedan (STS) trim level this model year, equipped with the FE2 touring suspension, 15-inch alloy wheels, upgraded springs, a rear sway bar, a 15.6:1 steering ratio for enhanced handling, grille mounted emblem, cloisonne trunk lock cover, and a four-passenger interior. Seville Touring Sedan production totaled 1,499 units in 1988. The first 1988 STSs were custom built by Cars and Concepts and announced at that year's Detroit Grand Prix. These initial run models were available to VIPs within General Motors, the Cadillac division, some major shareholders and a short list of dignitaries. A special label was affixed to the lower corner of the driver-side front door identifying it as one of the original STSs. The Elegante trim package, first introduced on Seville in 1978, was discontinued after the 1988 model year.

For 1989, the first production STSs were sold as a "Limited Edition" with an option code of YP6. Features from the 1988 model were carried over with the addition of a retuned suspension package for more precise steering and firmer feel of the road. Additional features included hand-stitched beechwood ultrasoft leather seats, anti-lock braking, touring suspension, a 3.3:1 drive ratio, 15-inch cast aluminum alloy wheels, and Goodyear Eagle GT4 blackwall tires.

Additional STS features included grille with flush-mounted wreath-and-crest, modified driver's front fender with the cornering light moved to the front fascia and headlight monitors removed, matching body-color front lower airdam and bodyside moldings, matte black export license pocket with bright bead, matte black front bumper impact pads and rear bumper guard vertical inserts, matching body color outside rearview mirrors with a black patch, modified (from Eldorado) rear reflexes (moved to the bumper), modified export taillamps with three-color European-style lenses, an STS nameplate on the deck lid, and an STS-exclusive cloisonne deck lid lock cover.

The STS interior had a 12-way power front seat, manual articulating front seat headrests, center front armrest with cassette and coin/cup storage console trimmed in ultrasoft leather, netted map pockets, rear bucket seats with integral headrests, center rear console and rear storage compartment, leather-wrapped front and rear door trim panels, door pull straps and overhead pull straps, high-gloss elm burl real wood appliques on door trim panels and switch plates, horn pad and bar, instrument panel and front and rear consoles, floor carpet (marketed as "Beechwood Thaxton" carpet) and a decklid liner in tara material with an STS logo. Other standard STS features included automatic door locks, illuminated driver and passenger side visor vanity mirrors, illuminated entry system, rear window defogger, a theft-deterrent system, and trunk mat.

Four exterior colors were available for the STS in 1989: White Diamond, Sable Black, Black Sapphire and Carmine Red. 1,893 Seville Touring Sedans (STS) were produced for the 1989 model year. The first models were leftovers from the Cars and Concepts run of the 1988 production year with the special sticker located on the lower part on the inside of the driver's door. These were produced prior to December 1988 for the 1989 production year and are rare. The last six digits of these VIN numbers would be below 808000. As with the 1988 model, a special 3.25" x 2" black/silver chrome label was affixed to the lower inside area of the driver-side front door by Cars and Concepts identifying it as one of the original STS models.

In 1990, the Seville received a new fuel injection system, increasing horsepower to 180. Front park lamps were no longer fender-mounted with any Cadillac model, and the STS was further modified, receiving revised side and rear body color fascias as well as dual exhaust outlets with bright stainless outlets, a larger STS trunk script, standard Teves anti-lock braking system with rear discs, and 16-inch machine finished alloy wheels on Goodyear Eagle GT+4 tires. A driver's side airbag was also added to Seville and STS. While the engine was the same as used in regular Seville models, the transmission had a special final drive ratio of 3.33:1 for better acceleration. The 1990 STS also received its own body designation of 6KY69, and prices started at $36,320. 1990 STS production totaled 2,811 vehicles.

There were no body changes in 1991, and the V8's displacement increased to 4.9-liter and featured a 4T60E electronically controlled transmission. The new V8 no longer used the A.I.R. system and additional refinements to the internals increased horsepower to 200. The only change to the STS was the removal of the rear bucket seats for a full-width bench and new front seats with larger side bolsters taken from the prior year's Eldorado Touring Coupe. 2,206 STS vehicles were produced.

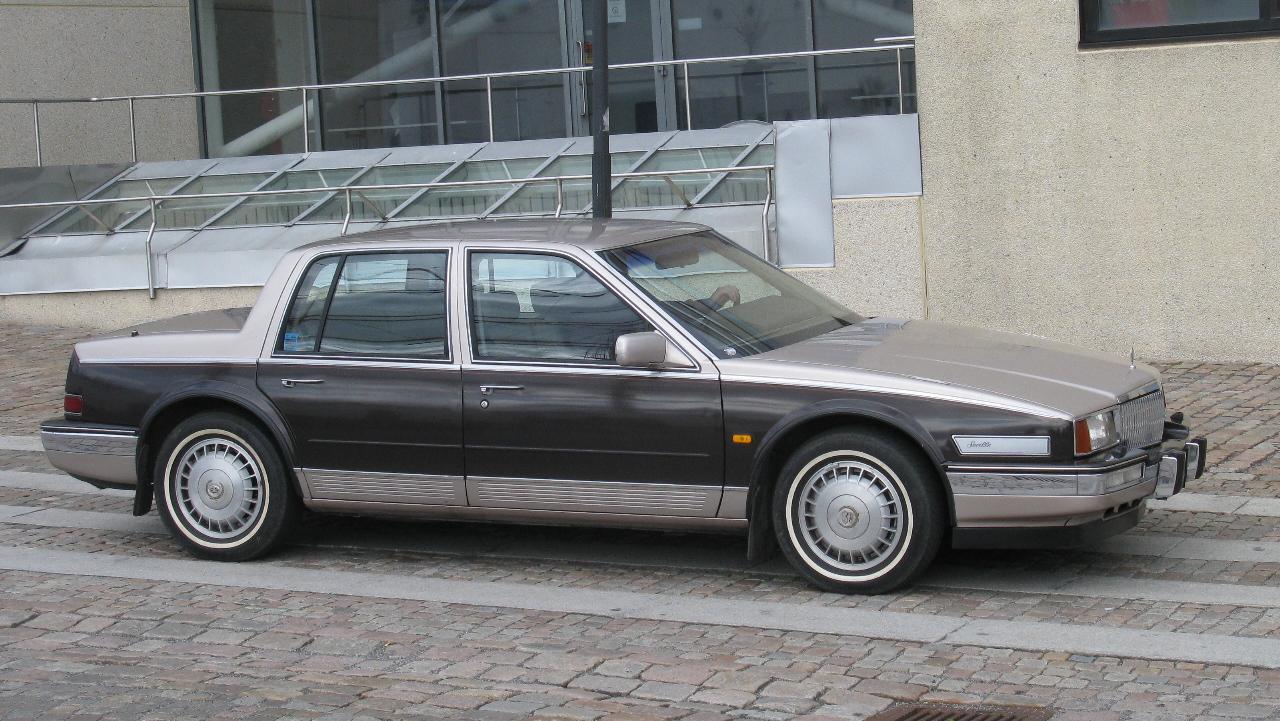
1987 Cadillac Seville

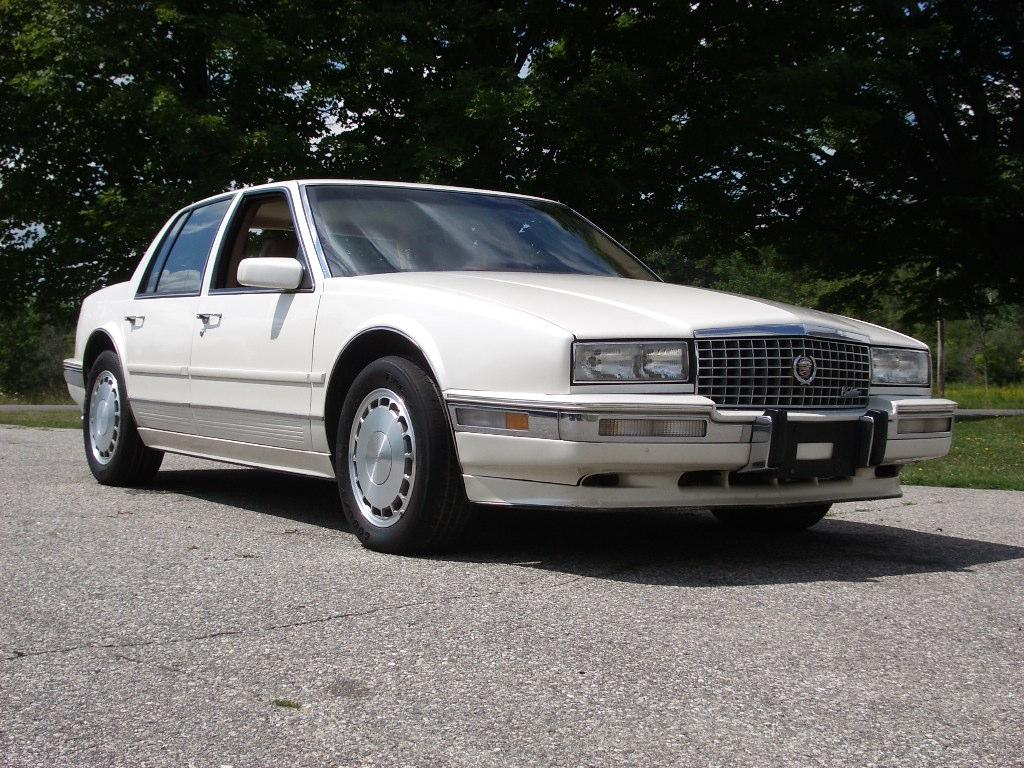
1990 Cadillac Seville STS

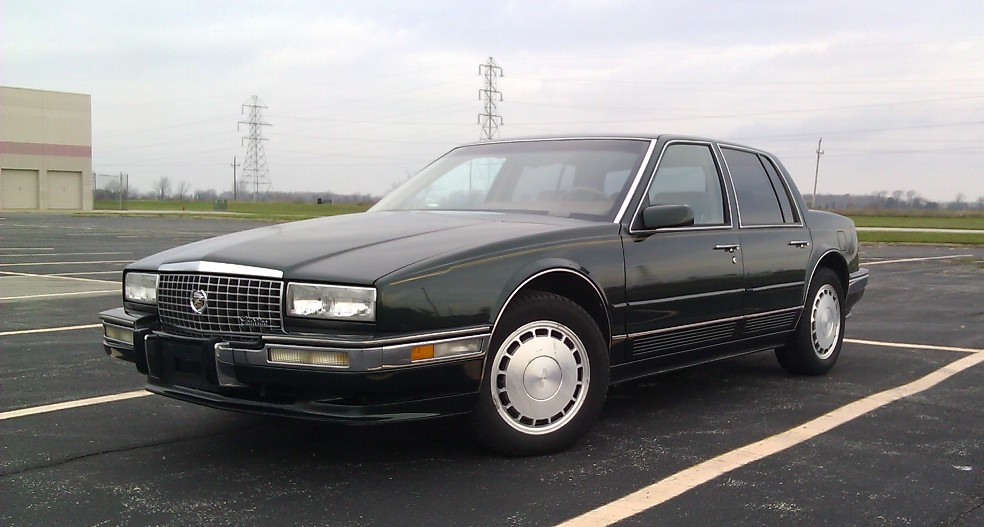
1991 Cadillac Seville STS

Production Figures:

Cadillac Seville Production Figures
	Seville	STS	Yearly Total
1986	19,098	-	19,098
1987	18,578	-	18,578
1988	22,968	1,499	24,467
1989	20,422	1,893	22,315
1990	32,235	1,893	34,128
1991	24,225	2,206	26,431
Total	137,526	7,491	145,017

=== Engines ===
Year	Engine	Power
1986–1987	4.1 L LT8 HT4100 V8	130 hp (97 kW)
1988–1989	4.5 L HT4500 V8	155 hp (116 kW)
1990	4.5 L LW2 HT4500 SFI V8	180 hp (134 kW)
1991	4.9 L L26 HT4900 SFI V8	200 hp (149 kW)

== Fourth generation (1992–1997) ==
Fourth generation
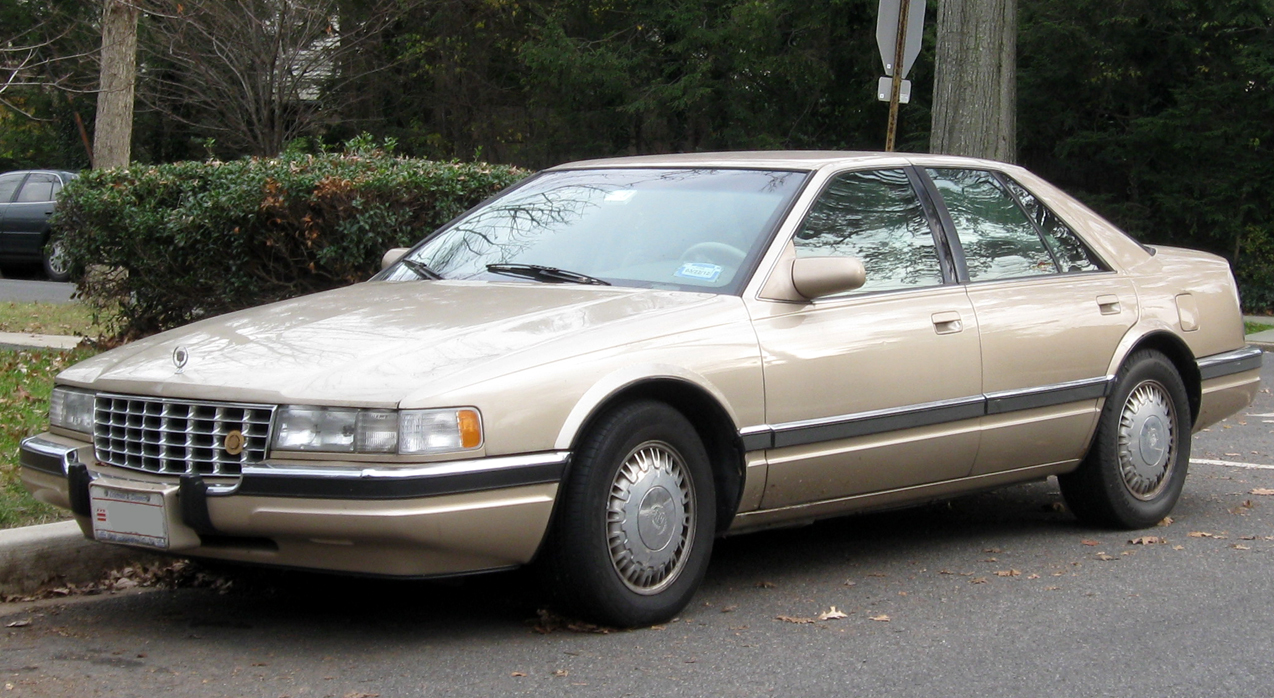

Overview
- Model years: 1992–1997
- Assembly: United States: Detroit/Hamtramck Assembly, Hamtramck, Michigan
- Designer: Dick Ruzzin (1989)

Body and chassis
- Body style: 4-door sedan
- Layout: Transverse front-engine, front-wheel drive
- Platform: K-body
- Related: Buick Riviera; Cadillac DeVille; Cadillac Eldorado; Oldsmobile Aurora

Powertrain
- Engine: 4.9 L HT-4900 V8; 4.6 L Northstar LD8 V8; 4.6 L Northstar L37 V8
- Transmission: 4-speed automatic

Dimensions
- Wheelbase: 111.0 in (2,819 mm)
- Length: 204.4 in (5,192 mm)
- Width: 1992–94: 74.3 in (1,887 mm); 1995–97: 74.2 in (1,885 mm)
- Height: 54.5 in (1,384 mm)
- Curb weight: 1,659–1,820 kg (3,657–4,012 lb)

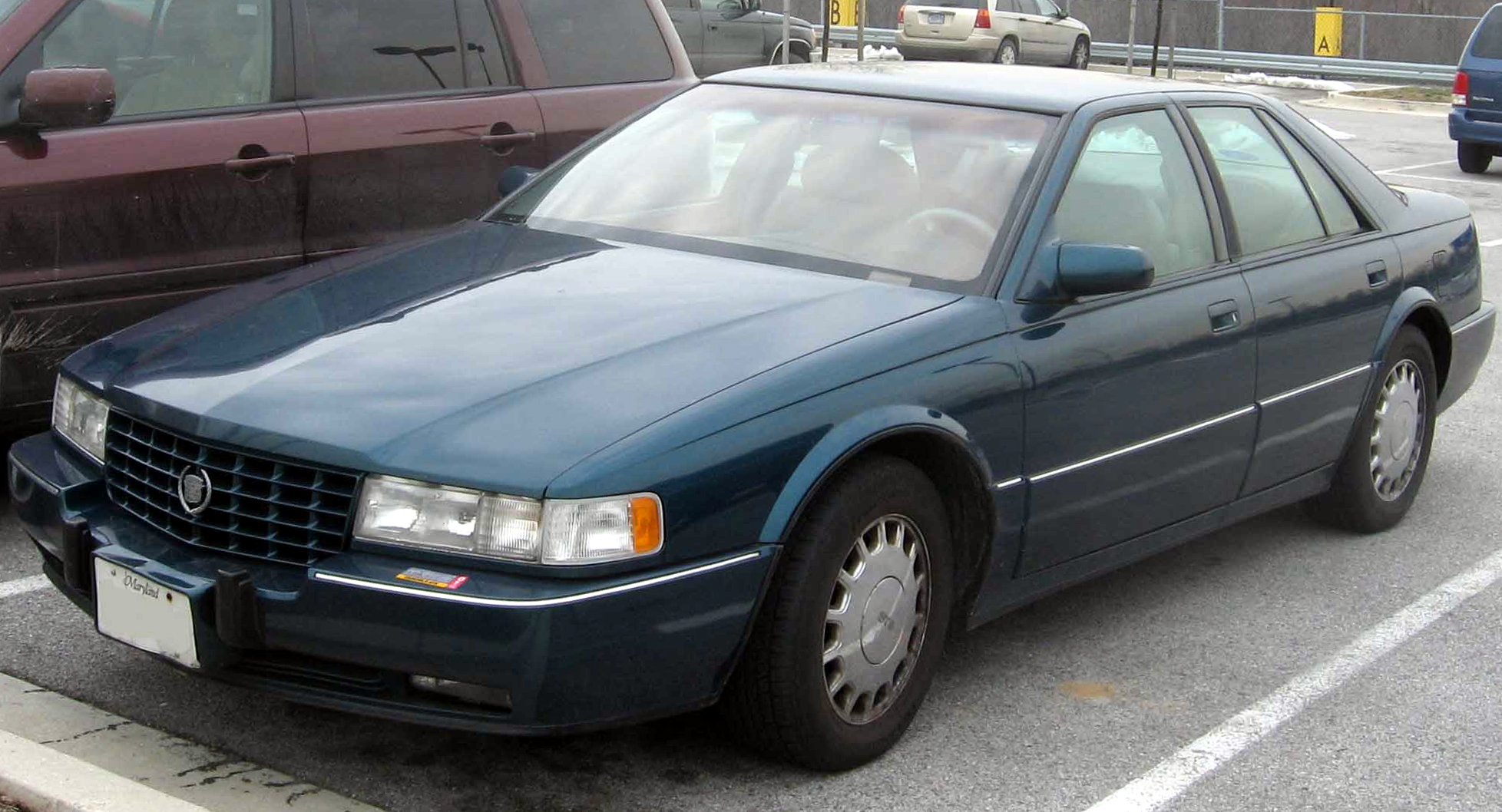
1995 Cadillac Seville STS

The Seville was redesigned for 1992 model year. Wheelbase increased 3 inches to 111 in (2,800 mm) and overall length over 13 inches to 203.9 in (5,180 mm). The upright formal roofline was replaced by a steeply raked rear window.

The range was divided into two sub-models:

- The Seville Luxury Sedan (SLS) was introduced with the 4.9 L HT-4900 V8 and received a 270 hp (200 kW) LD8 Northstar V8 for 1994
- The Seville Touring Sedan (STS) also began with the 4.9 L HT-4900 in 1992 and was upgraded to the 295 hp (220 kW) L37 Northstar in 1993

The Seville Touring Sedan was Motor Trend magazine's Car of the Year for 1992. It also made Car and Driver magazine's Ten Best list that year. The Seville STS adopted styling cues from the 1988 Cadillac Voyage concept car.

0–60 mph times were 7.4 seconds for the SLS and 6.9 seconds for the STS. Rain sensing wipers, called RainSense, were standard on the STS.

From 1994 onward, both models were equipped with the GM 4T80 transmission but different final drive. There were model specific bumpers, side plastic molding and rear taillights. The STS models featured body-colored front grille, while the SLS models had a chrome-plated grille and a Cadillac hood badge. On the inside, the STS models used more Zebrawood trim compared to the SLS. The seats in the STS models were covered with perforated leather, in contrast with the non-perforated leather on the SLS. The SLS models could have been specified with the optional column shifter. The STS models featured active suspension (CVRSS), while the SLS models were equipped with passive suspension. Both models were equipped with speed-sensitive steering effort and rear pneumatic self-levelling suspension, power antenna, soft-close trunk lid and two driver memories for seats, rear view mirrors, climate control, and sound system settings.

The 1993 addition of the Northstar System, including the Northstar quad-cam 32-valve aluminum V8 and a new unequal-length control arm rear suspension to the STS, helped increase sales. The rear suspension previously featured a single transverse leaf spring like the Chevrolet Corvette.

For the 1994 model year, the Seville STS (and companion Eldorado ETC) became the most powerful front-wheel-drive car on the market at 300 hp (224 kW).

For the 1996 model year, the interior was revised on both models, including seats, central console, shifter knob and door trim. Due to the 1996 OBD-II compliance mandate, most electronic modules were revised. Two sound system options were introduced: the base Delco system and the optional Bose system, both featuring AM/FM radio and tape player. Both could be connected to the optional trunk-mounted 12-disc CD player and the optional cellular phone. The Bose sound system included four amplifiers and added Digital signal processor (DSP) and Radio Data System (RDS). In some export markets the sound system was slightly different. Steering controls were standard for the climate control and the sound system. The exterior changes were minimal; for the STS models, seven-spoke, 16-inch aluminum rims were introduced in silver finish and as an option in chrome finish. Depending on the tire options, the top speed was limited to 130 mph ("H" rated tires) or 156 mph ("Z" rated tires).

In 1997, some of the electronic modules were further updated for OBD-II compliance reasons. A revised climate control module was introduced, and there were updates to the stability system with the addition of a yaw sensor. Some of the advanced DIC self diagnostic features were removed, requiring a TechII scanner tool instead. The TheftLock feature was added to the Head Unit (HU). The heated windshield option was no longer available for 1997.

Base prices for both models peaked in 1996 at US$42,995 (equivalent to $90,800 in 2025) for the SLS and US$47,495 (equivalent to $100,400 in 2025) for the STS, but the increasingly competitive luxury car market resulted in price reductions for 1997. They were reduced to $39,995 (equivalent to $84,500 in 2025) for the SLS and $44,995 (equivalent to $95,100 in 2025) for the STS.

Production Figures:

Cadillac Seville Production Figures
	Yearly Total
1992	43,953
1993	37,239
1994	46,713
1995	38,931
1996	38,238
1997	42,117
Total	247,191

=== Engines ===
Model	Year	Engine	Power	Torque
Seville Luxury Sedan (SLS)	1992–1993	4.9 L HT-4900 V8	200 hp (149 kW)	275 lb·ft (373 N·m)
Seville Luxury Sedan (SLS)	1994	4.6 L LD8 Northstar V8	270 hp (201 kW)	300 lb·ft (407 N·m)
Seville Luxury Sedan (SLS)	1995–1997	4.6 L LD8 Northstar V8	275 hp (205 kW)	300 lb·ft (407 N·m)
Seville Touring Sedan (STS)	1992	4.9 L HT-4900 V8	200 hp (149 kW)	275 lb·ft (373 N·m)
Seville Touring Sedan (STS)	1993	4.6 L L37 Northstar V8	295 hp (220 kW)	290 lb·ft (393 N·m)
Seville Touring Sedan (STS)	1994–1997	4.6 L L37 Northstar V8	300 hp (224 kW) at 6000 rpm	295 lb·ft (400 N·m) at 4400 rpm

== Fifth generation (1998–2004) ==
Fifth generation
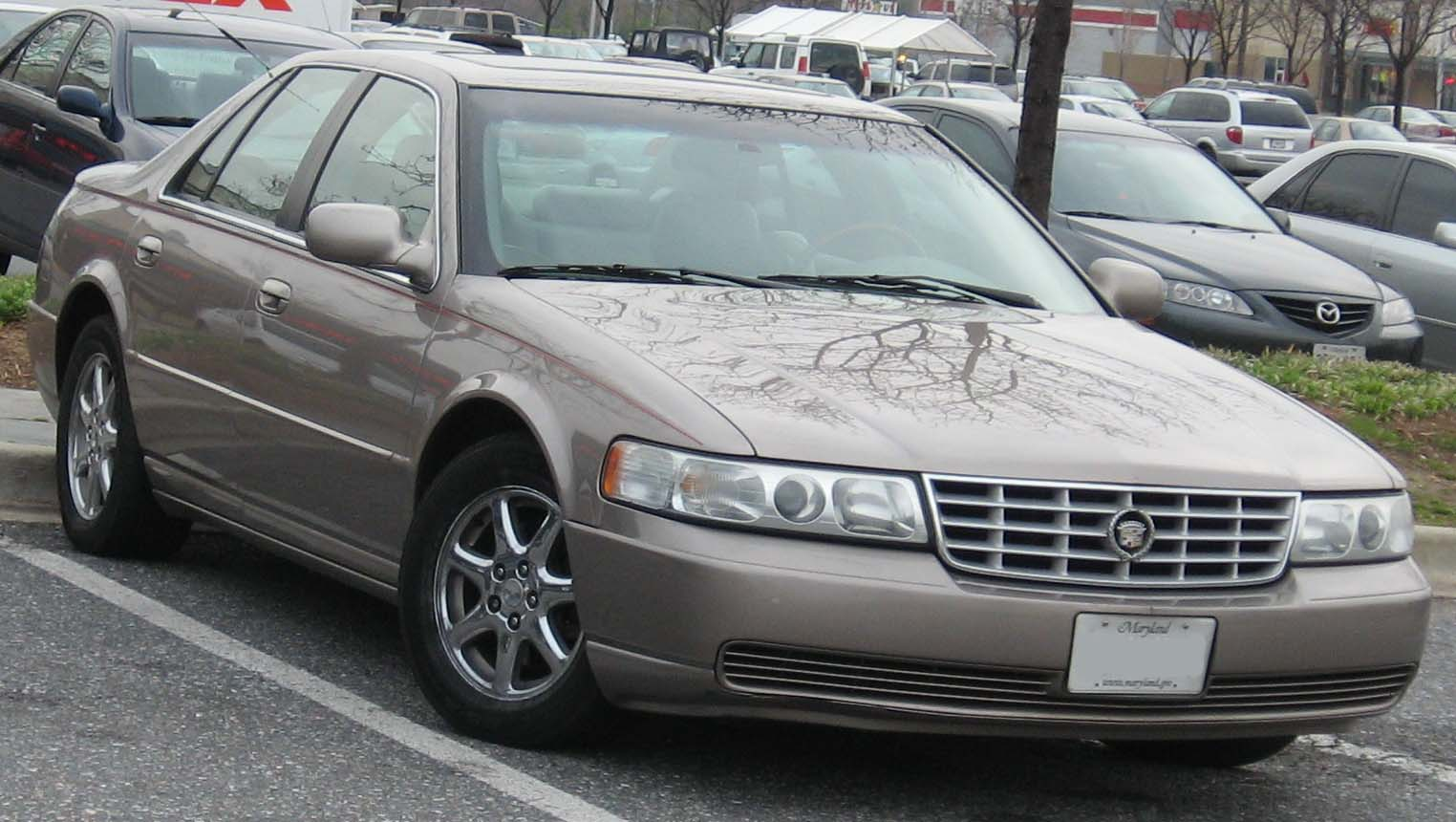

Overview
- Production: 1997–2003
- Model years: 1998–2004
- Assembly: United States: Detroit/Hamtramck Assembly, Hamtramck, Michigan

Body and chassis
- Body style: 4-door sedan
- Layout: Transverse front-engine, front-wheel drive
- Platform: G platform
- Related: Buick LeSabre; Buick Park Avenue; Cadillac DeVille; Oldsmobile Aurora; Pontiac Bonneville

Powertrain
- Engine: 4.6 L LD8/L37 V8
- Transmission: 4-speed automatic

Dimensions
- Wheelbase: 112.2 in (2,850 mm)
- Length: 201.0 in (5,105 mm) (US version); 196.8 in (4,999 mm) (Export version)
- Width: 75.0 in (1,905 mm)
- Height: SLS: 55.7 in (1,415 mm); STS: 55.4 in (1,407 mm)
- Curb weight: SLS: 3,970 lb (1,800 kg); STS: 4,001 lb (1,815 kg)

The fifth and final generation Seville was introduced at the Germany Frankfurt Motor Show in September 1997 for 1998 model year, built on GM's G platform (which GM chose to continue to refer to as the K). All transverse engine front-wheel drive Sevilles were built at Detroit/Hamtramck Assembly in Hamtramck, Michigan.

The wheelbase was extended to 112.2 in (2,850 mm), but the overall length was down slightly to 201 in (5,100 mm). The car looked similar to the fourth-generation model, and featured numerous suspension and drivability revisions. The Seville STS (and companion Eldorado ETC) continued as the most powerful front-wheel drive cars on the market at 300 hp (224 kW). The top STS model ran 0–60 mph in 6.4 seconds and had a 14.8 second quarter-mile time.

The fifth-generation Seville was the first Cadillac engineered in both left- and right-hand-drive form, as well as the first modern Cadillac to be officially marketed in several right-hand-drive markets such as Hong Kong and the United Kingdom. Models sold in Japan were both left- and right-hand drive. In the past, right-hand-drive Cadillacs were manufactured from CKD kits or special conversion kits shipped for local conversion. There was also an export version of the fifth-generation Seville, with shorter bumpers to fit beneath a five-meter overall length taxation threshold. The 1998 Seville was the first Cadillac launched with a European type approval number in Europe; first in the United Kingdom, then Germany, Belgium, France, Spain, Italy, Finland and other markets.

On the fifth-generation Seville, the steering column was a power tilt and telescoping unit with its operation tied into the memory functions. The soft-close trunk lid and power antenna was no longer available. The car's security system was now equipped with the Passlock III, an update for the resistor-based Passlock II, which was updated from the previous generation. Also updated from the previous generation was the sound system, which added a head unit with radio, tape and CD player. The cellular phone option was still available, while the optional trunk-mounted CD player was replaced with a six-disc unit. Between 1998 and 1999, a first-generation (non-touch screen) GPS navigation option was available. It was updated in 2000 with a larger DVD-based touchscreen GPS navigation unit.

In 1999, a one-year only (for the Seville) massage seats option was available. In 2000, the tire-pressure monitoring system (TPMS) became available as an option. In January 2002, the STS received a new MagneRide adaptive suspension system (unavailable on the SLS), becoming the first production vehicle equipped standard with such suspension technology.

Production of the Seville STS ended on May 16, 2003. Seville SLS production ended seven months later, on December 4, 2003. In 2004, only the Seville SLS model was available for purchase. The Seville model name was discontinued for 2005 and replaced by the Cadillac STS.

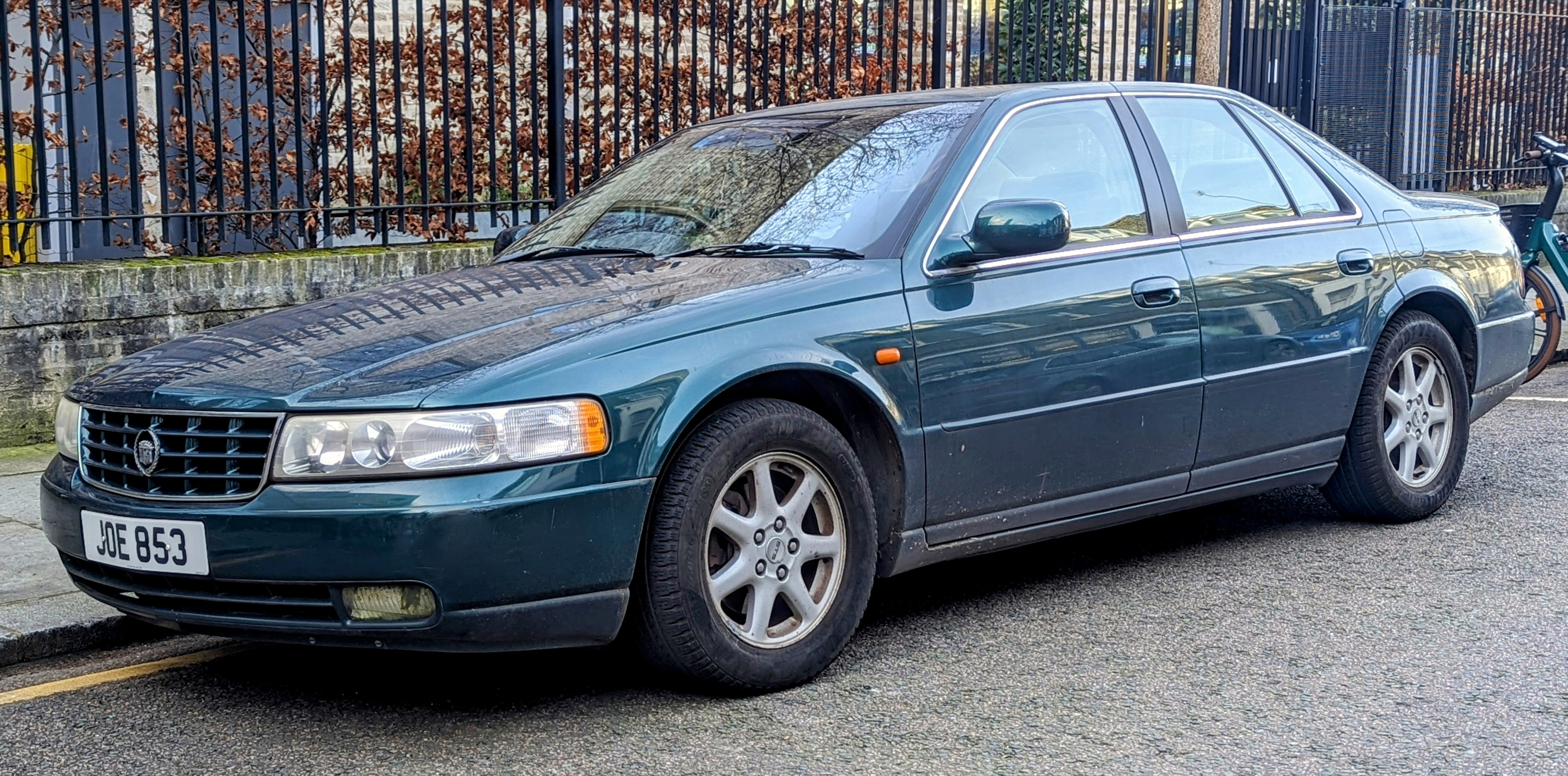
Euro-spec Seville STS with shorter bumpers and additional turn signal lights (UK)

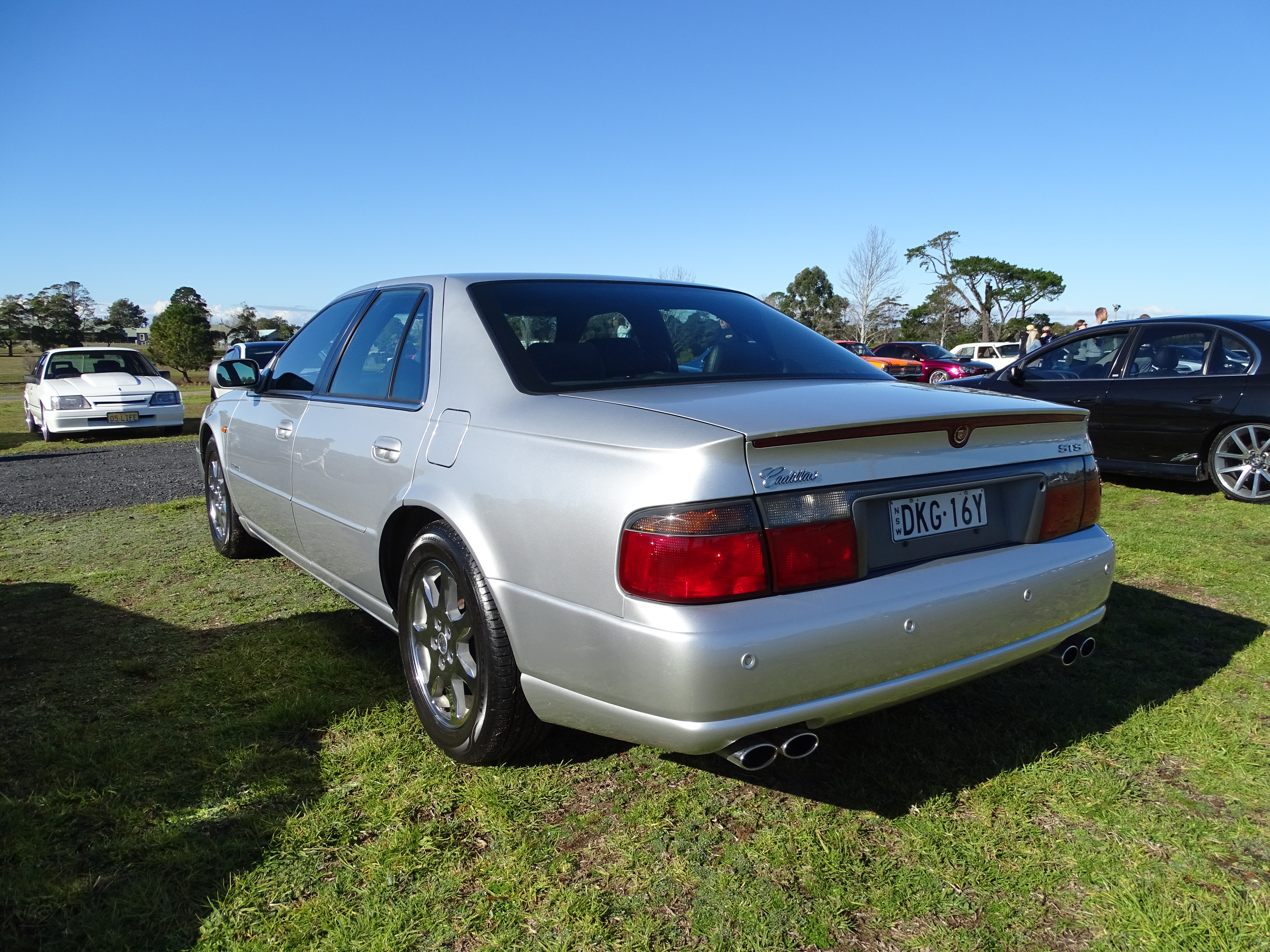
STS, rear view

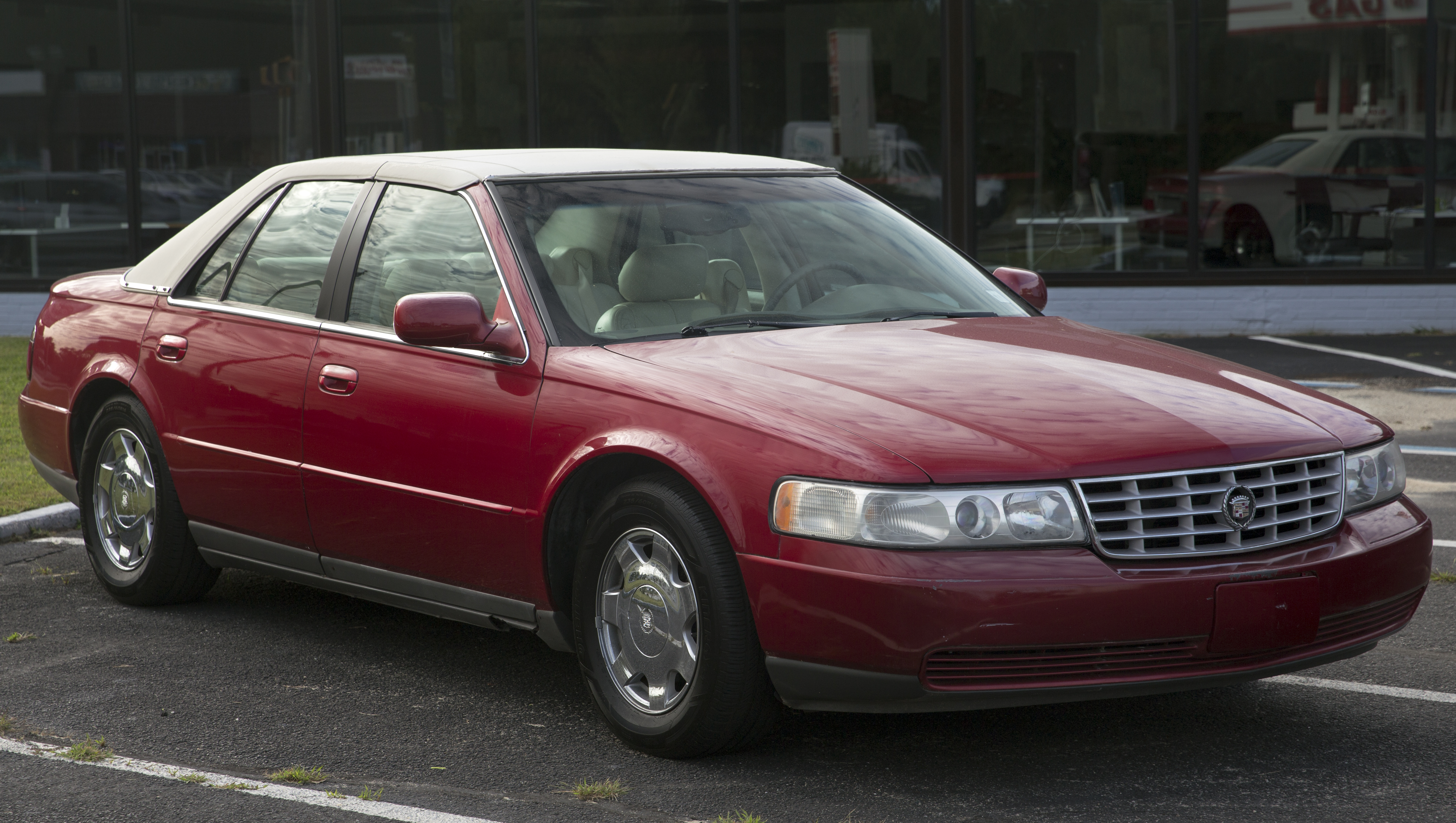
2000 Cadillac Seville SLS

=== Engines ===
Model	Year	Engine name	Engine size	Power	Torque
STS	1998–2003	L37 Northstar	4.6 L (4,565 cc) V8	300 hp (224 kW) at 6000 rpm	295 lb⋅ft (400 N⋅m) at 4400 rpm
SLS	1998–2004	LD8 Northstar	4.6 L (4,565 cc) V8	275 hp (205 kW) at 5600 rpm	300 lb⋅ft (407 N⋅m) at 4000 rpm

=== US sales ===
Calendar Year	Sales Numbers
1998	39,009
1999	33,532
2000	29,535
2001	25,290
2002	21,494
2003	18,747
2004	3,386
2005	137

== Bibliography ==
- "Salute to William L. Mitchell - Vice President - General Motors Design" (PDF). General Motors Design Impact. General Motors Corporation. July 1977. Archived from the original (PDF) on July 9, 2011.
