= Saville (disambiguation) =

Saville is a surname.

Saville may also refer to:

- SAVILLE, a Type 1 encryption algorithm
- Saville (novel) by David Storey which won the Booker Prize for fiction in 1976
- Saville Township, Pennsylvania

== See also ==
- Saville Australia, defunct Australian property company
- Saville Dam, a dam in Barkhamsted, Connecticut
- Saville Theatre, London
- Saville Report on the Bloody Sunday shootings (Northern Ireland, 1972)
