= Peter Saville =

Peter Saville may refer to:

- Peter Saville (graphic designer) (born 1955), English art director and graphic designer
- Peter Saville (psychologist) (1946-2022), British psychologist
- Peter Savill, former chairman of the British Horse Racing Board
