= Seville (disambiguation) =

Seville (Spanish: Sevilla) is a city in Andalusia, Spain.

Seville or Sevilla may also refer to:

== Spain and Portugal ==
- Sevilla FC, a football team which plays in the city of Seville
- Seville (province), a province in Andalusia
  - Sevilla (Spanish Congress Electoral District), the electoral district covering the province
- Sevilla la Nueva, in Madrid
- Sevilha, in Coimbra, Portugal
- Sevilla (Madrid Metro), a Metro Station in Madrid.

== Americas ==
=== Colombia ===
- Sevilla, Antioquía
- Sevilla, Arauca
- Sevilla, Atlántico
- Sevilla, Boyaca
- Sevilla, Caldas
- Sevilla, Casanare
- Sevilla, Córdoba
- Sevilla, Huila
- Sevilla, Magdalena
- Sevilla, Santander
- Sevilla, Tolima
- Sevilla, Valle del Cauca

=== Costa Rica ===
- Sevilla, San José

=== Cuba ===
- Sevilla, Villa Clara
- Sevilla, Santiago de Cuba

=== Ecuador ===
- Sevilla, Chimborazo
- Sevilla, Sucumbios

=== Jamaica ===
- Sevilla la Nueva (Jamaica), the first Spanish settlement in Jamaica and the third capital established by Spain in the Americas.
- Maima-Seville Heritage Park, a site for heritage education and heritage attraction created by The Jamaica National Heritage Trust in the former location of Sevilla la Nueva settlement

=== Mexico ===
- Sevilla metro station (Mexico City), Mexico

=== Panama ===
- Sevilla, Chiriquí

=== United States ===
- Seville, California
- Seville, Florida
- Seville, Georgia
- Seville, Ohio
- Seville Township, Michigan

== Australia ==
- Seville, Victoria, a suburb of Melbourne
- Seville Grove, Western Australia, a suburb of Perth

== Equatorial Guinea ==
- Sevilla de Niefang, former name for Niefang, Centro Sur Province

== Philippines ==
- Sevilla, Bohol

== Other uses ==
- Sevilla (surname)
- The Seville Orange (bitter orange), a tart orange used in making marmalade, usually planted as decorative trees in Seville, Spain
- "Sevilla", song by BZN
- Sevilla (Albéniz), a composition by Isaac Albéniz
- Cadillac Seville, an American automobile by the Cadillac division of General Motors
- Universidad de Sevilla, a university in Seville, Spain
- Seville Agreement, an agreement drafted within the Red Cross Movement
- Seville (band), a rock group from Florida
- Seville Statement on Violence, written by scientists in honor of 1986 UN International Year of Peace
- Bryan Matthew Sevilla, the real name of pornographic actor James Deen
- Dave Seville, stage name of Ross Bagdasarian Sr.; also a major character in the Alvin and the Chipmunks franchise
- Gloria Sevilla (1932–2022), Filipina actress
- Sevilla (Madrid Metro), a station on Line 2 of the Metro Madrid
- Seville, Spain (photograph), a photograph by Henri Cartier-Bresson

== See also ==
- The Barber of Seville, opera by Gioachino Rossini
