= Arthur Savile =

English clergyman and cricketer

Arthur Savile (20 December 1819 – 23 April 1870) was an English clergyman and a cricketer who played first-class cricket for Cambridge University and other amateur teams between 1839 and 1841. He was born at Methley in Yorkshire and died at Fowlmere in Cambridgeshire.

Savile was the sixth son of John Savile, 3rd Earl of Mexborough, and of his wife Anne, who was the daughter of Philip Yorke, 3rd Earl of Hardwicke. Throughout his life, he was styled as "The Honourable Arthur Savile". He was educated at Eton College and at Trinity College, Cambridge.

As a cricketer, Savile was a middle-order batsman, and he appears not to have bowled, though he played one first-class match for a team called the "Fast Bowlers" in 1841 and in any case records from his time as a cricketer are incomplete. He played three times from 1836 to 1838 for Eton in the annual Eton v Harrow cricket match before going to Cambridge University in 1839. He was not successful in first-class cricket. In his first match for Cambridge University, he scored 14 not out in the first innings of the match against the Marylebone Cricket Club (MCC), but that remained his highest score, and in his only other appearance for the university side, in the University Match against Oxford University in 1840, he scored just 3 and 1. Three matches for MCC produced just 11 runs in four innings, while he failed to score in either innings of his other first-class game.

Savile graduated from Cambridge University in 1841 and was ordained as a deacon and then as a priest within the Church of England from 1844 to his death. From 1843 to 1847 he was curate at three different churches: St Clement Danes in London, St Nicholas' Church in Warwick, and then in the parish of Monks Kirby with Withybrook in north Warwickshire. In 1847 he was appointed vicar at Ashby Magna in Leicestershire and in 1850 he moved to be vicar at Fowlmere in Cambridgeshire, where he remained until his death, aged 50.

Savile married Lucy Neville, daughter of Richard Griffin, 3rd Baron Braybrooke, in 1852 and they had eight daughters and two sons. His death was reported as being sudden: "after a few hours' illness, of acute inflammation of the windpipe".
