= Tad Tadlock =

American actress (1931–2000)

- Tadlock in undated photo
- Born: Thelma Tadlock; January 13, 1931; Port Arthur, Texas
- Died: December 8, 2000 (aged 69)
- Occupation: Dancer-choreographer
- Years active: 1951–1994
- Spouse: George Vosburgh Jr.

Thelma "Tad" Tadlock (January 19, 1931 – December 8, 2000) was an American dancer and choreographer known for her work in television, Broadway theater, and movies, including starring in the General Motors sponsored-film shorts "Design for Dreaming" (1956) a film which contributed scenes for Peter Gabriel's 1986 music video "In Your Eyes" and "A Touch of Magic" (1961).

== Early life ==
Tadlock was born in Port Arthur, Texas, the daughter of Haydn H. and florist Thelma Tadlock. She trained for 15 years at the Florence Coleman School of Dance and served as a football majorette for Thomas Jefferson High School, where she graduated in 1949.

== Career ==
Tadlock moved to New York City in 1950 and made her Broadway debut as a dancer in the 1951 musical Make a Wish. Continuing her training at the Stanley School of Dance, she went on to the Broadway-musical hits Top Banana (1951), Pal Joey (1952), and Me and Juliet (1953), billed in all as Thelma Tadlock, and both dancing and playing character roles in the latter two.

She then began work in television and film, working as a dancer and choreographer for decades, initially on TV's Your Hit Parade and The Arthur Murray Party. Later billed as Tad Tadlock, she worked on Dance Fever, The Dream Merchants, Charlie's Angels, Cheers and other programs, including Ziegfeld: The Man and His Women, and such events as the 1988 Miss Universe pageant and the 1989 Super Bowl halftime show. Her movies included Heaven's Gate (as "additional choreographer"), Body Heat and Irreconcilable Differences. Tadlock also worked as a spokeswoman, actress, model, and dancer in numerous commercials, including for United Airlines.

Tadlock and Marc Breaux in "Design for Dreaming" (1956)

She as well performed in multimedia presentations for clients including Toyota, and is perhaps best known for two General Motors sponsored-film shorts that have become cult classics: the musicals "Design for Dreaming" (1956), directed by William Beaudine, and "A Touch of Magic" (1961), directed by Victor D. Solow.

In the first, which has gone on to be excerpted and sampled in a host of media, Tadlock plays an unnamed woman who dreams about a masked man (dancer and choreographer Marc Breaux) taking her to the 1956 General Motors Motorama at the Waldorf-Astoria Hotel, and to Frigidaire's "Kitchen of the Future". It was included in a fifth-season episode of Mystery Science Theater 3000 in 1994. In the equally highly stylized "A Touch of Magic", Tadlock plays a medieval woman menaced by a dragon and rescued by a knight. She and the man then suddenly become a modern-day suburban couple with a magical kitchen, hosting a housewarming party attended by invisible guests, and then dancing dreamily on a cloud.

== Personal life ==
In June 1960, in New York City, Tadlock married George Vosburgh Jr., an assistant director of the 1958 feature documentary Windjammer and later a TV game-show producer. Her reception was held in the home of talk-show host and TV personality Merv Griffin. Following her marriage, she was billed at least once as Tad Tadlock Vosburgh. Tadlock was living in Tarzana, California, at the time of her death from cancer.

== Legacy ==
The Museum of the Gulf Coast maintains a Tad Tadlock permanent exhibit.
