= Home of the future =

Architectural genre exploring domestic effects of technology

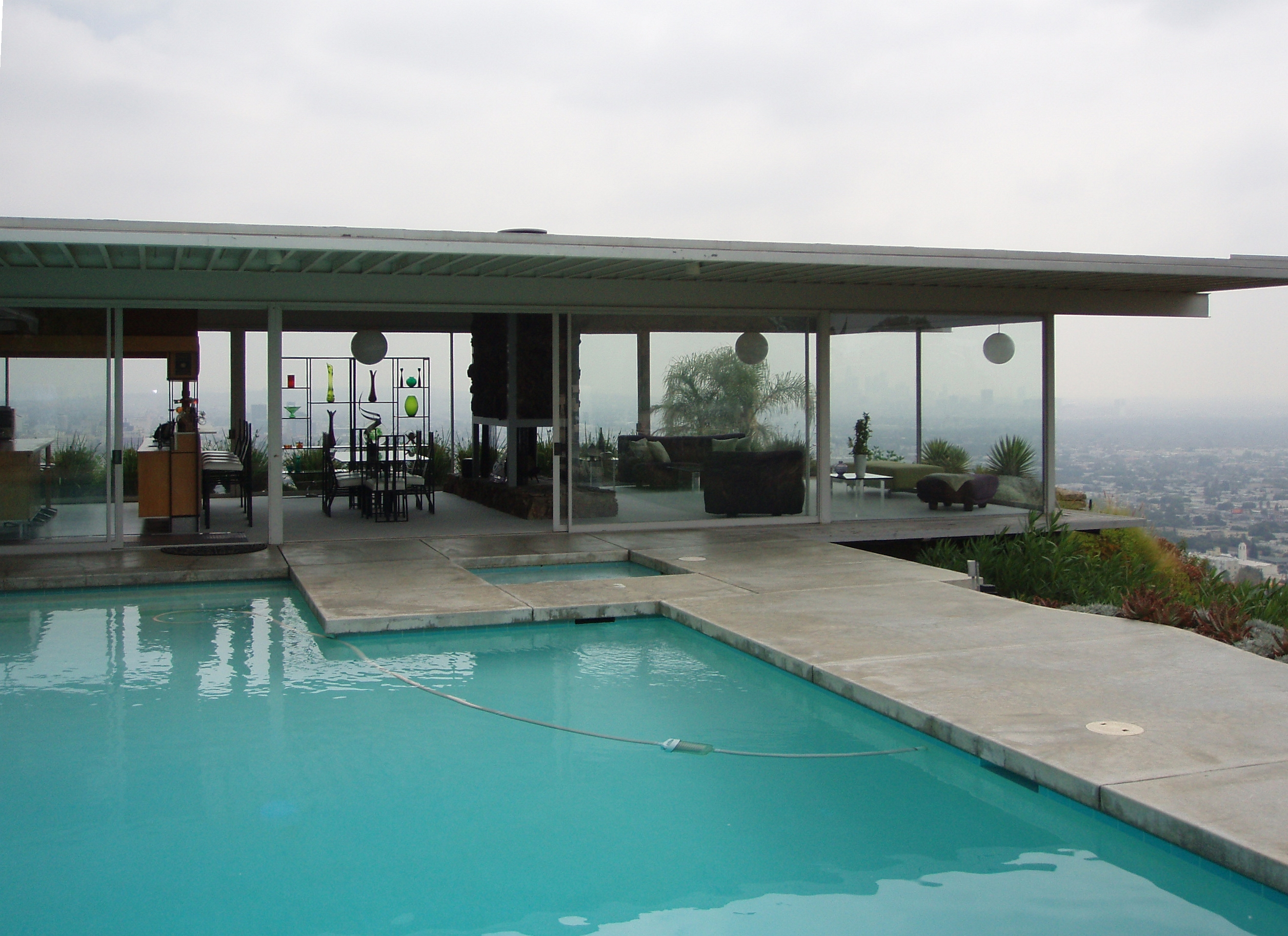
The Stahl House, one of the Case Study Houses built as models for residential architecture after World War II

The home of the future, similar to the office of the future, is a concept that has been popular to explore since the early 20th century, or perhaps earlier.

== History ==
There have been many exhibits, such as at World's Fairs and theme parks, purporting to show how future homes will look and work, as well as standalone model "homes of the future" sponsored by builders, developers or technology companies. After a few years, each successive version of such an exhibit will start to look dated and old-fashioned, with some of its "futuristic" things becoming commonplace and others never catching on at all.

The film Design for Dreaming (1956) shows a Frigidaire "Kitchen of the Future"—part of the 1956 General Motors Motorama—which features centralized controls and a "computer screen" showing a completed recipe. General Motors also presented A Touch of Magic (1961), which also showed a Frigidaire kitchen of the future.

In the 1960s and 1970s, such exhibits usually included videophones. While such technology has actually existed since the 1960s and has been developed and improved since, many new mobile phones can now make video calls and use of a home web camera on an instant messaging client and sending of pictures via cell-phone cameras has become prevalent. Other common features of "home of the future" exhibits include centralized and automated control of all appliances, and the use of voice commands to operate devices. Since the 1980s, computer technology has figured heavily in the design of these homes.

The Monsanto House of the Future, a house made entirely of plastics in Disneyland from 1957 to 1967, was a famous example in this genre.

== See also ==
Architecture

- Biomorphic architecture
- Expressionist architecture
- Neomodern
- Neo-Futurism

House types

- Futuro
- Sanzhi UFO houses
- Venturo

Automation

- Building automation
- Home automation

Other

- 1933 Homes of Tomorrow Exhibition
- Home computer
- House of the Future, Cardiff
- House of the Future (Phoenix)
- Kitchen Debate
- Living with the Future
- Smart House (film)
