= Oldsmobile Golden Rocket =

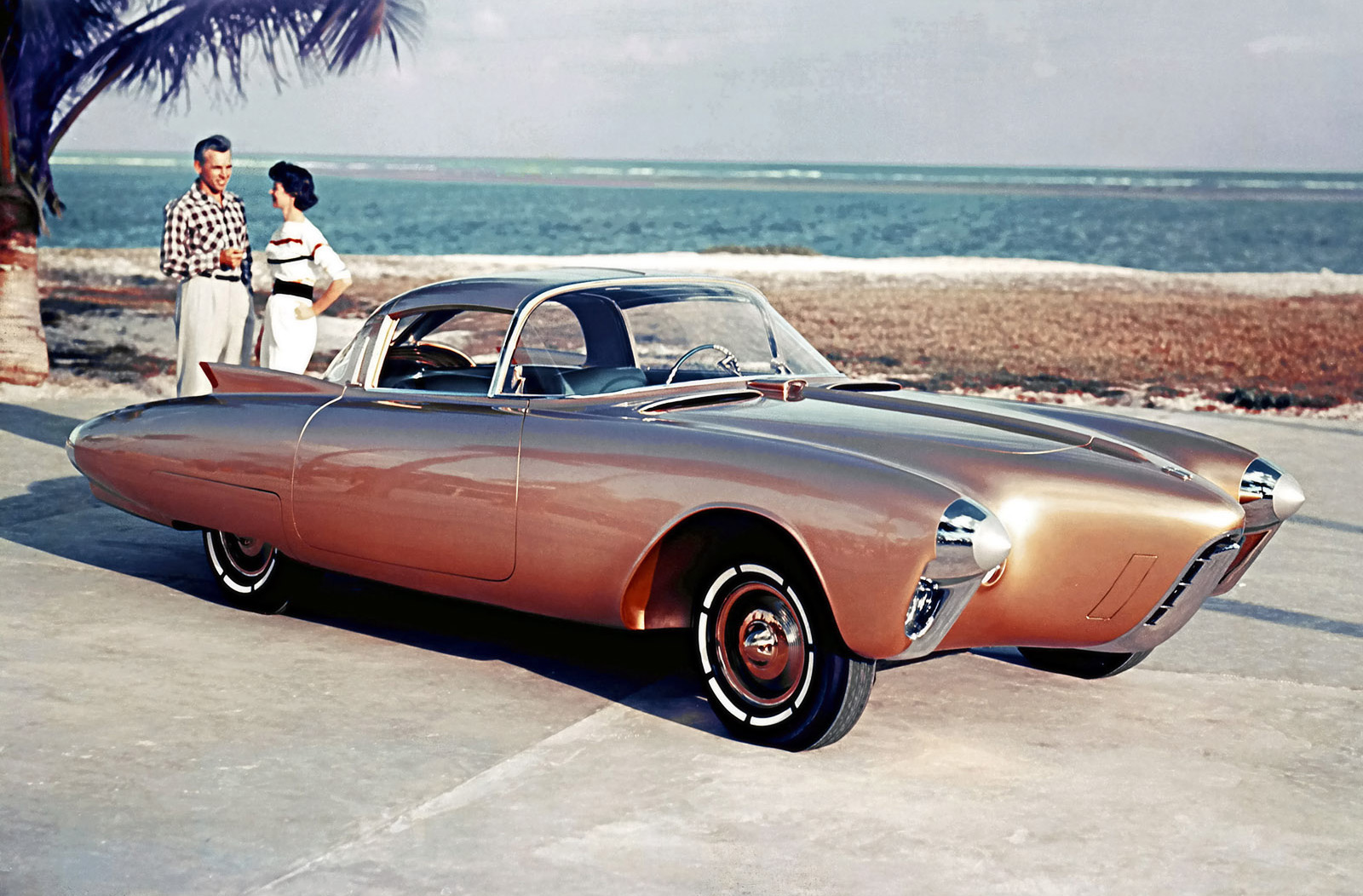

Overview
- Manufacturer: Oldsmobile (General Motors)
- Also called: XP-400 / SO 2490
- Production: one prototype built
- Model years: 1956 (concept car)
- Designer: Harley Earl

Body and chassis
- Class: Sports car
- Body style: 2-door fastback
- Layout: FR layout

Powertrain
- Engine: 324 cu in (5.3 L) Rocket V8
- Power output: 275 hp (205 kW)
- Transmission: Hydra-Matic automatic

Dimensions
- Wheelbase: 105 in (2,667 mm)
- Length: 201.1 in (5,108 mm)
- Width: 75.4 in (1,915 mm)
- Height: 49.5 in (1,257 mm)
- Curb weight: 2,500 lb (1,134 kg)

Chronology
- Predecessor: Oldsmobile Cutlass (1954)

The Oldsmobile Golden Rocket was a two-seater show car built by Oldsmobile for the 1956 General Motors Motorama. The radically styled fiberglass concept, designed to resemble a rocket on wheels, was revised several times and displayed at various other auto shows, most notably at the 1957 Paris Motor Show where it generated much fanfare, 18 months after it was first revealed. The car was featured in the promotional short film Design for Dreaming along with the rest of the 1956 General Motors lineup.

== Overview ==
=== Exterior ===
Similar to other Space Age show cars, the Golden Rocket was heavily influenced by the themes of aviation and space exploration. Its sleek, aerodynamic body was made entirely of lightweight fiberglass and finished in metallic bronze paint. Bullet-shaped chrome pieces resembling Dagmar bumpers were integrated into the front fenders in place of headlights as well as the sweeping rear fenders, giving the car an overall rocket-like appearance. Other notable features include a swept-back wrap-around windshield, which had already become a common design element by the mid-1950s, less prominent tailfins by contemporary standards and a split-window fastback roof design presaging the 1963 Chevrolet Corvette Stingray. It rode on unique "dotted-line" whitewall tires. A later photo taken inside the GM Design Center in Warren, Michigan shows the car sporting a blue paint scheme.

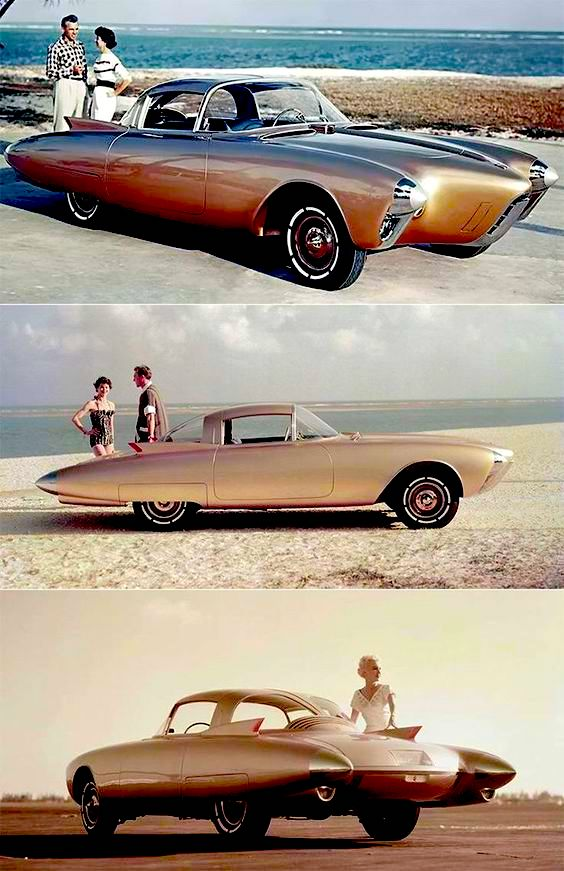
Oldsmobile Golden Rocket concept car

=== Interior ===
The leather upholstery was finished in blue and gold. When a door was opened, the two-piece roof panel rose automatically in a similar manner to the Mercedes-Benz 300 SL's gull-wing doors. The seats were raised up by three inches and swiveled outwards by 45 degrees, enabling easier access to the passenger compartment. One of its most pioneering innovations was the button-controlled tilt steering wheel, making it one of the first vehicles with such a feature. The speedometer was placed at the center of the foldable two-spoke steering wheel. The futuristic center console and control levers were inspired by an aircraft cockpit.

=== Powertrain ===
The car was powered by an upgraded 324-cubic inch Rocket V8 engine tuned to produce 275 horsepower (205 kW). According to interior photos, the Golden Rocket had an automatic transmission like all other Motorama show cars. Details on other internal components, however, are unavailable.

=== Design legacy ===
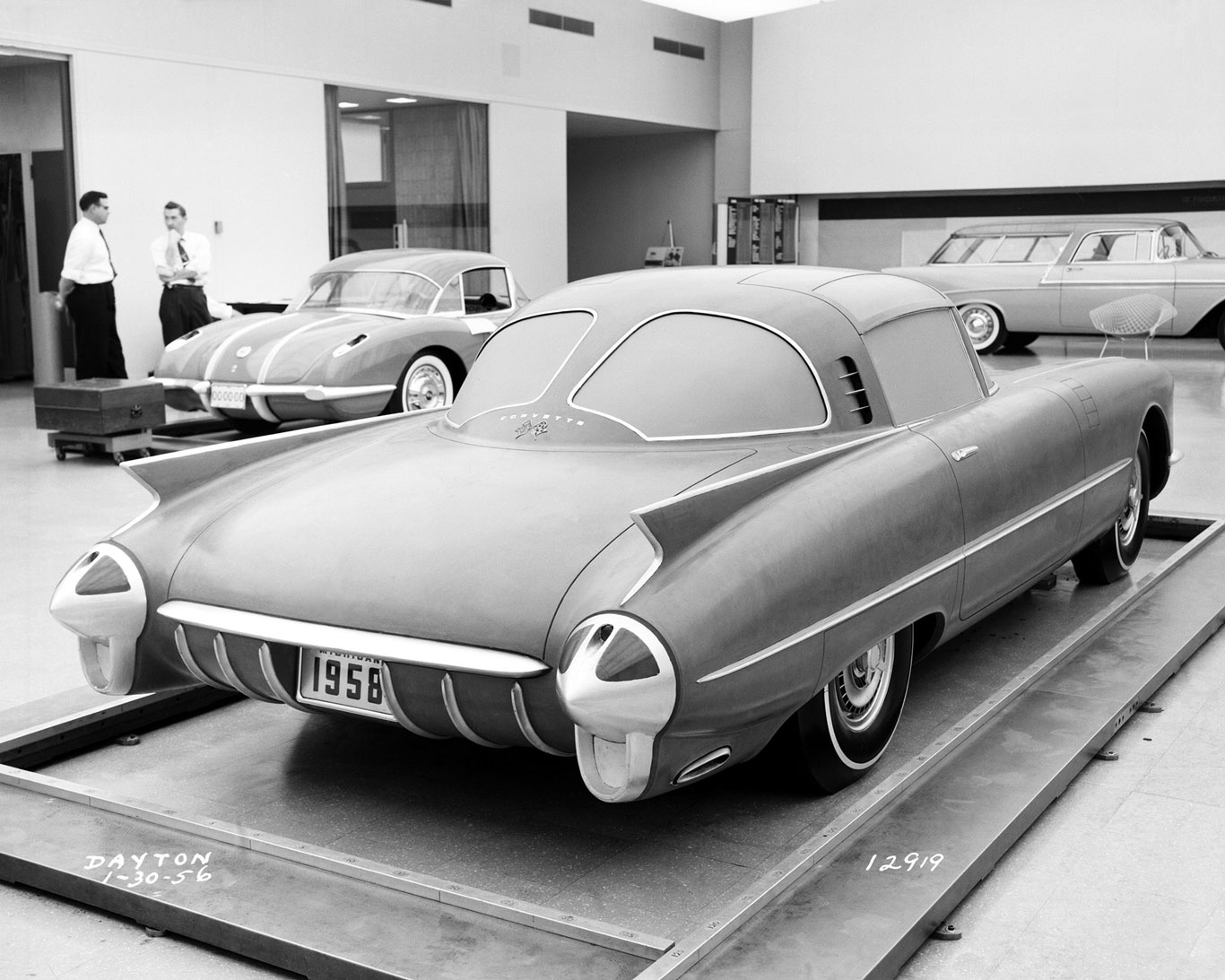
Early pre-production prototype of the 1958 Chevrolet Corvette

An early styling mock-up of the 1958 Chevrolet Corvette, built around 1956, depicted a fixed-roof fastback coupe with a rear design taken almost directly from the Golden Rocket show car, right down to the torpedo-shaped rear fenders and subtle tail fins. However, this design proposal never reached beyond the clay model stage and a more conventional design was used on the production model instead.

Seven years later, under the direction of General Motors head of design Bill Mitchell, the split rear window design would reappear on the 1963 Corvette Stingray coupe. It lasted for one model year before being changed to a single-piece rear window due to a problem of poor rear visibility.

== Current status ==
It is unclear if the Golden Rocket still exists today. A common practice of General Motors in the 1950s was to destroy show cars after they fell out of usage in order to avoid liability concerns; however, the Golden Rocket is still unaccounted for with no confirmation it was crushed. There is photographic evidence that the car still existed as late as 1962, while several other show cars were scrapped earlier in 1959. The car was reportedly located somewhere in New Jersey, however the rumor still remains unconfirmed even after extensive investigation. Motorama historian David W. Temple believes that the Golden Rocket, along with other lost show cars, will likely never resurface again.

== See also ==
- Pontiac Club de Mer, another show car built for the 1956 Motorama season
