= General Motors Motorama =

Auto show from 1949 to 1961

Motorama
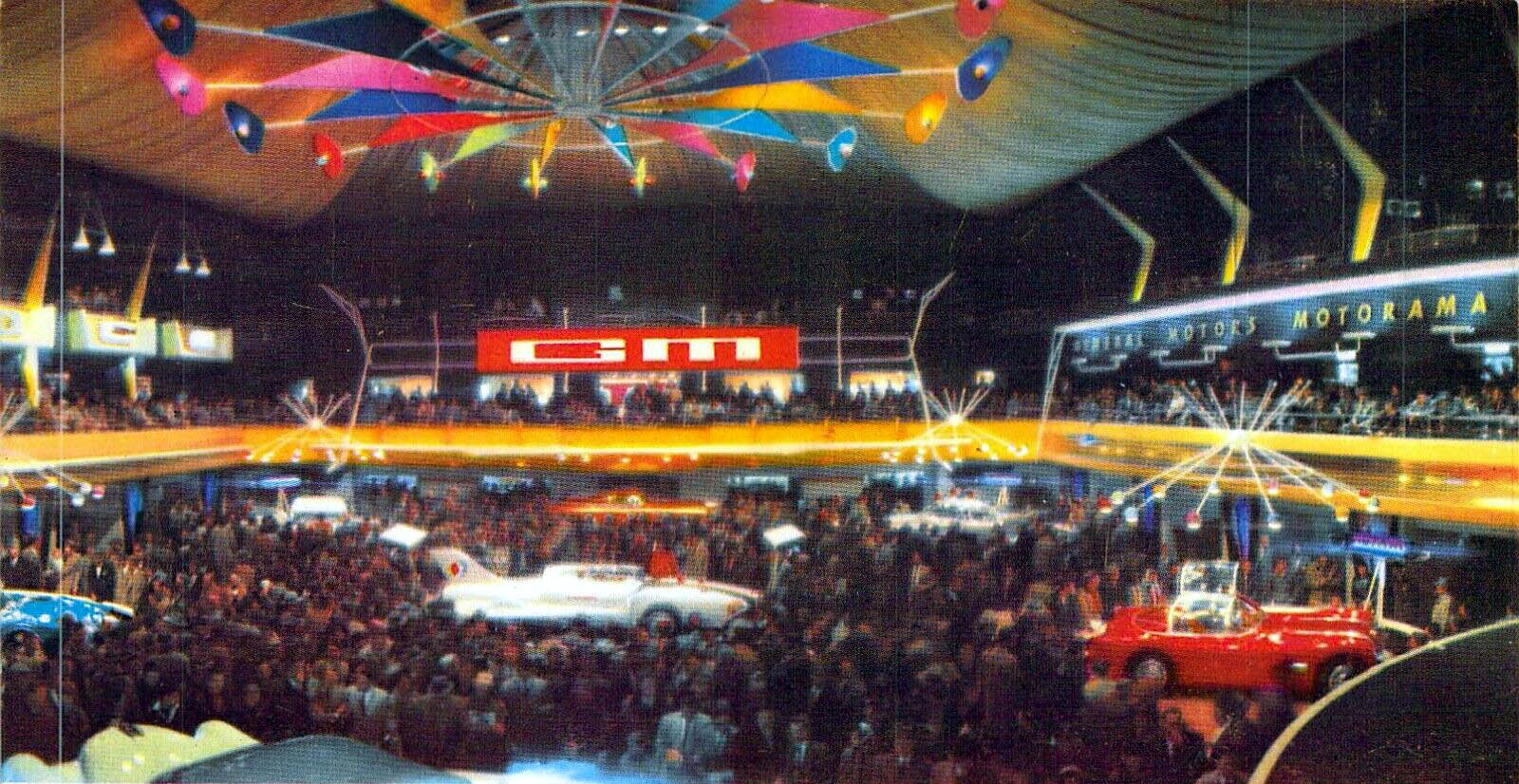
- The 1954 Motorama displayed in a postcard
- Duration: 1949–1961
- Location: United States
- Type: Auto show
- Organised by: General Motors

The General Motors Motorama was an auto show staged by GM from 1949 to 1961. These automobile extravaganzas were designed to whet public appetite and boost automobile sales with displays of fancy concept cars and other special or halo models. Motorama grew out of Alfred P. Sloan's yearly industrial luncheons at New York City's Waldorf-Astoria Hotel, beginning in 1931. They were almost invariably held in conjunction with the New York Auto Show, that for many years was held traditionally in the first week of January.

== History ==
=== 1949 ===
After World War II, the first show, "Transportation Unlimited Autorama", was staged again at the Waldorf Astoria, in January 1949. Between the New York City venue and the Boston extension, nearly 600,000 people saw the show. Seven "special" Cadillacs were exhibited including, inter alia, a Series 61 coupe and a Series 62 sedan that were standard except for a special paint finish; also shown were The Caribbean, the Embassy, and the Fleetwood Coupe de Ville, all built on the Series Sixty Special chassis.

=== 1950 ===
During the 1950 show, more than 320,000 visitors admired the Cadillac Debutante, a special convertible trimmed in leopard skins. There was no Autorama or Motorama in 1952. Cadillac celebrated its Golden Anniversary (50 years of production) in 1952, and two show cars were on display at various venues around the country: the Cadillac Townsman, a custom Series Sixty Special sedan, and the Cadillac Eldorado special convertible that went into limited production in 1953.

=== 1953 and 1954 ===
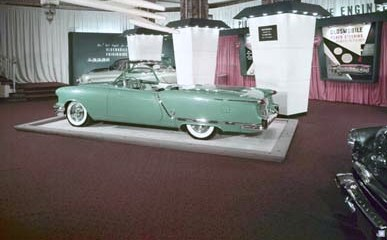
An Oldsmobile Starfire exhibited at the Waldorf-Astoria in 1953

The show officially became known as Motorama when it began to travel around the country in 1953. That year more than 1.4 million visitors saw it; Motorama's opening day in New York drew 45,000 visitors. There was a revue, with orchestra, singers, and dancers. Exhibited at this venue were the Buick Wildcat, Pontiac La Parisienne, Oldsmobile Starfire, Chevrolet Corvette, Cadillac Orleans and Le Mans. More than 1.9 million visitors attended the show in 1954; it started on January 26 in the Waldorf Astoria, New York. On display were the experimental Oldsmobile F-88 and Cutlass, Buick Wildcat II, Chevrolet Nomad station wagon, General Motors Firebird XP-21 and Pontiac Bonneville Special, Cadillac El Camino, Cadillac La Espada and Cadillac Park Avenue, all featuring fiberglass bodies.

=== 1955 and 1956 ===
The 1955 show dates were New York (January 20–25), Miami (February 5–13), Los Angeles (March 5–13), San Francisco (March 26 to April 3), Boston (April 23 to May 1). Exhibited at these venues were the Buick Wildcat III, Chevrolet Biscayne, Pontiac Strato Star, Oldsmobile 88 Delta, LaSalle II roadster and sedan, and Cadillac Eldorado Brougham. Oldsmobile and Buick pillarless four-door hardtops were first shown at this show.

In 1956 over 2.2 million visitors attended. The dates were New York City (January 19–24), Miami (February 4–12), Los Angeles (March 3–11), San Francisco (March 24 to April 1), Boston (April 19–29). Featured cars included Buick Centurion, General Motors Firebird II, the Oldsmobile Golden Rocket, Pontiac Club de Mer, Cadillac Eldorado Brougham and Eldorado Brougham Town Car. Fans of Mystery Science Theater 3000 will recognize the 1956 show as the Motorama featured in the short film Design for Dreaming.

No shows were held for the next two years. In 1957, however, Cadillac did display a couple of show cars at various venues. These were the Cadillac Director and the Eldorado Brougham town car of the previous year. Also, in 1958, a special Cadillac Eldorado Biarritz convertible toured various automobile shows; it was equipped with a rain sensor designed to automatically raise the top and all window glass, in case of a rain shower.

=== 1959–1961 ===
The "1959" Motorama was held from October 16–22, 1958, at the Waldorf Astoria, New York City, before moving on to Boston. Shown in these two east coast cities were General Motors Firebird III and the Cadillac Cyclone.

The final Motorama show was held in 1961 in New York, San Francisco and Los Angeles. During November 21–23, 1961, the exhibit was brought to Basel, Switzerland. More than one million visitors attended. A Touch of Magic was the official film for the 1961 Motorama.

More than 100 trucks were needed to transport Motorama shows around the country, each arriving at a precise time and in a given order. Cars and simultaneous revues were displayed on lifting, revolving platforms known as "grass-hoppers".

A total of 10.5 million visitors saw Motorama shows between 1949 and 1961.

== See also ==
- 1950s American automobile culture
- Design for Dreaming
- Flo, a 1957 Motorama show car depicted in the 2006 film Cars
