= General Motors Air Transport =

Corporate air service

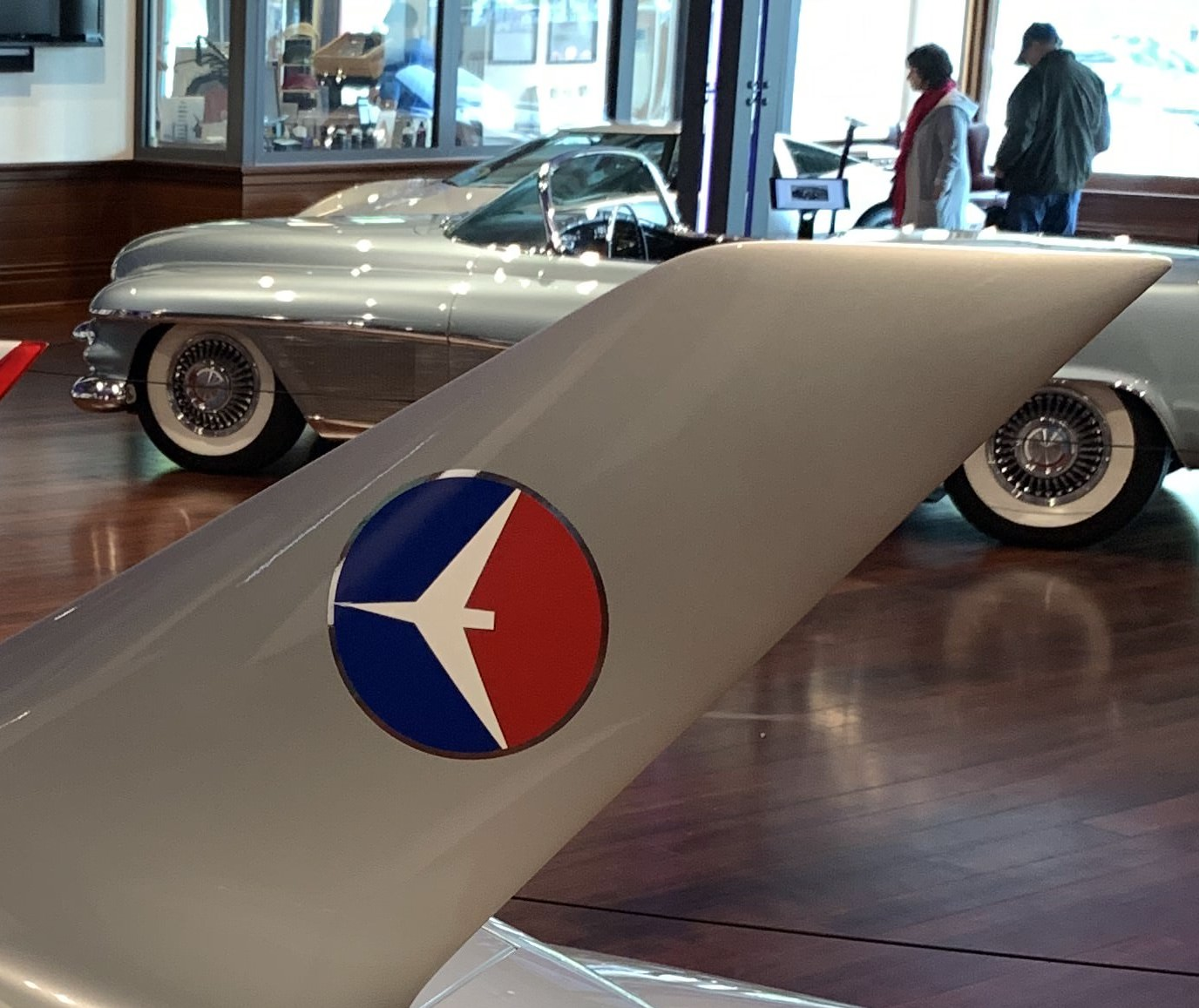
GMATS Logo as seen on the GM Firebird III show car

The General Motors Air Transport Section (GMATS) was a corporate air service operated by General Motors to provide fast transportation for employees that needed to travel between various GM locations. Originally named the "Air Transport Section of General Motors Corporation", it colloquially became known as the General Motors Air Transport Section.

== History ==
Prior to World War II, General Motors briefly owned Eastern Airlines, but sold it by 1938 to quell any monopoly concerns and smooth the way for wartime production contracts. While the sale of the commercial airline meant GM did not have access to in-house air transportation, there was still a vital need for quick transportation between GM facilities. During the company's involvement in wartime production between 1940 and 1945 many of the individual divisions acquired military aircraft to aid in production and efficiency at plants widely dispersed across North America. Harold R. “Bill” Boyer of Grosse Pointe, Michigan, a former General Motors vice president and head of GM Cadillac Cleveland Tank Division was key in the creation of the air transport infrastructure within GM. In 1948, GM updated and consolidated the corporate aircraft under the control of Operations-Central Office Aircraft, within the Central Office Manufacturing Staff. By 1952 this was reorganized into the General Motors Air Transport Section.

In 1961, GMATS had a total of 36 pilots and 150 maintenance staff, and by 1965 this had grown to 27 pilots, 27 co-pilots and a total staff of 230. In 1965, Willow Run, Michigan served as the maintenance base for GMATS, with the main passenger facility at Detroit City Airport. Anderson Municipal Airport in Indiana was another major hub for GMATS, as the region had important production facilities and no regularly scheduled flights.

In 1999, GM and DaimlerChrysler established a joint venture company, Automotive Air Charter, to use excess capacity of their respective corporate air services to meet demand in the charter business.

In November 2008, General Motors Chairman Rick Wagoner (along with Ford and Chrysler CEO's) flew to Washington D.C. to ask for government assistance. All three were heavily criticized for flying on private jets while asking for government funding. In an attempt to hide the flight status of the air fleet GM requested (and was granted) permission to remove GM owned aircraft from tracking under the NBAA's Block Aircraft Registration Request program. As part of GM's subsequent financial collapse and bailout, the company was forced to close the corporate aviation section. This included laying off the remaining staff, relinquishing the leases on seven jets, and closing the passenger facility at Detroit Municipal Airport.

GMATS helped establish the Bachelor of Science in Aviation Management degree at Eastern Michigan University.

Former GMATS directors included Eugene (Gene) Zepp (ret. 1978), and Ken Emrick (ca. 1993).

== Fleet ==
Historically, GMATS flew the following equipment:

- Beechcraft Queen Air
- Cessna Citation X
- Convair 580
- Convair 340
- Douglas DC-3
- Gulfstream V
- Saab 2000
- Rockwell Sabreliner
- Grumman Gulfstream II
- Beechcraft King Air
- Beechcraft King Air 200

== Logo ==
The GMATS logo was painted on various GM location helipads. It can be viewed in a historic satellite view of the GM Technical Center at 42.30436,-83.02413(image from 2012, as of 2020 the helipad has been painted over), and at the former Rochester Products Division building in Rochester, NY at 43.044055,-77.651925 (image from 2002, as of 2019 the helipad has been painted over). The logo was also used on GM show cars during the 1950s and 1960s, including the Firebird II, Firebird III, and initially on the Cadillac Cyclone.

== See also ==
- Ford Air Transport Service
- Pentastar Aviation
