= Buick Century Cruiser =

The Buick Century Cruiser was a dream car (concept car) created by Buick in 1969. It was conceived as being designed for automated highways, where steering wheels would be unnecessary. The vehicle offered swivel contour seats, a refrigerator, and a TV set. The computerized car would be programmed by punch cards with predetermined routes programmed by information provided by electric highway centers. The vehicle would be monitored by a radar like device. The vehicle would also have a device to steer the vehicle manually as well as controlling speed. The canopy would slide open for easy cockpit access. It was related to the Firebird IV concept car and shares an appearance with the GM-X Stiletto.
