= A Touch of Magic =

1961 American sponsored film

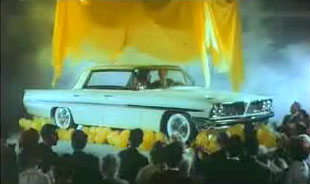
"The 1961 Pontiac! It's bewitchingly beautiful!"

A Touch of Magic (1961) is a cult-classic General Motors sponsored-film short musical.

The film begins with a designer at the drawing board, daydreaming about a 1920s couple who travel to the Middle Ages; the Man saves the Woman from a wizard ("an evil charmer") and a dragon, only to abruptly discover that they are all performing for an audience in the 1960s. The film then features the couple courting in General Motors' latest cars. Now married, the Man and Woman next appear in an early 1960s style home of the future with a magical kitchen; they host a housewarming party attended by invisible guests. We last see the couple dancing dreamily on a cloud.

The film, which entered into the public domain, was produced and directed by Victor D. Solow through MPO Productions. Joseph Moncure March and Edward Eliscu wrote the script and lyrics, while Sol Kaplan wrote the score. It starred dancers Tad Tadlock (real name Thelma Tadlock) and James Mitchell, with the singing voices of Anita Ellis and Ed Kenney.

This is one in a series of Populuxe films and events sponsored by General Motors. The series began with the General Motors Futurama exhibit at the 1939 World's Fair, which displayed a vision of the future involving urban sprawl and multilane limited access freeways. GM's later Motorama exhibits continued this theme into the 1960s. A Touch of Magic was the film for the 1961 Motorama.

== Selected quotes ==
- Man – "This dream house you and I will share/Was planned for us by Frigidaire"
- Man and Woman – "Aladdin's lamp has had its day/This modern magic is here to stay"
- Man and Woman – "A touch of magic every day/Is the charm that goes the long long way/It keeps our spirits young and gay/And the magic is constantly new/In a world full of magic with..."

== See also ==
- Design for Dreaming, another GM film in the same series, also starring Tad Tadlock
