= Cadillac Cyclone =

Concept car developed by Cadillac

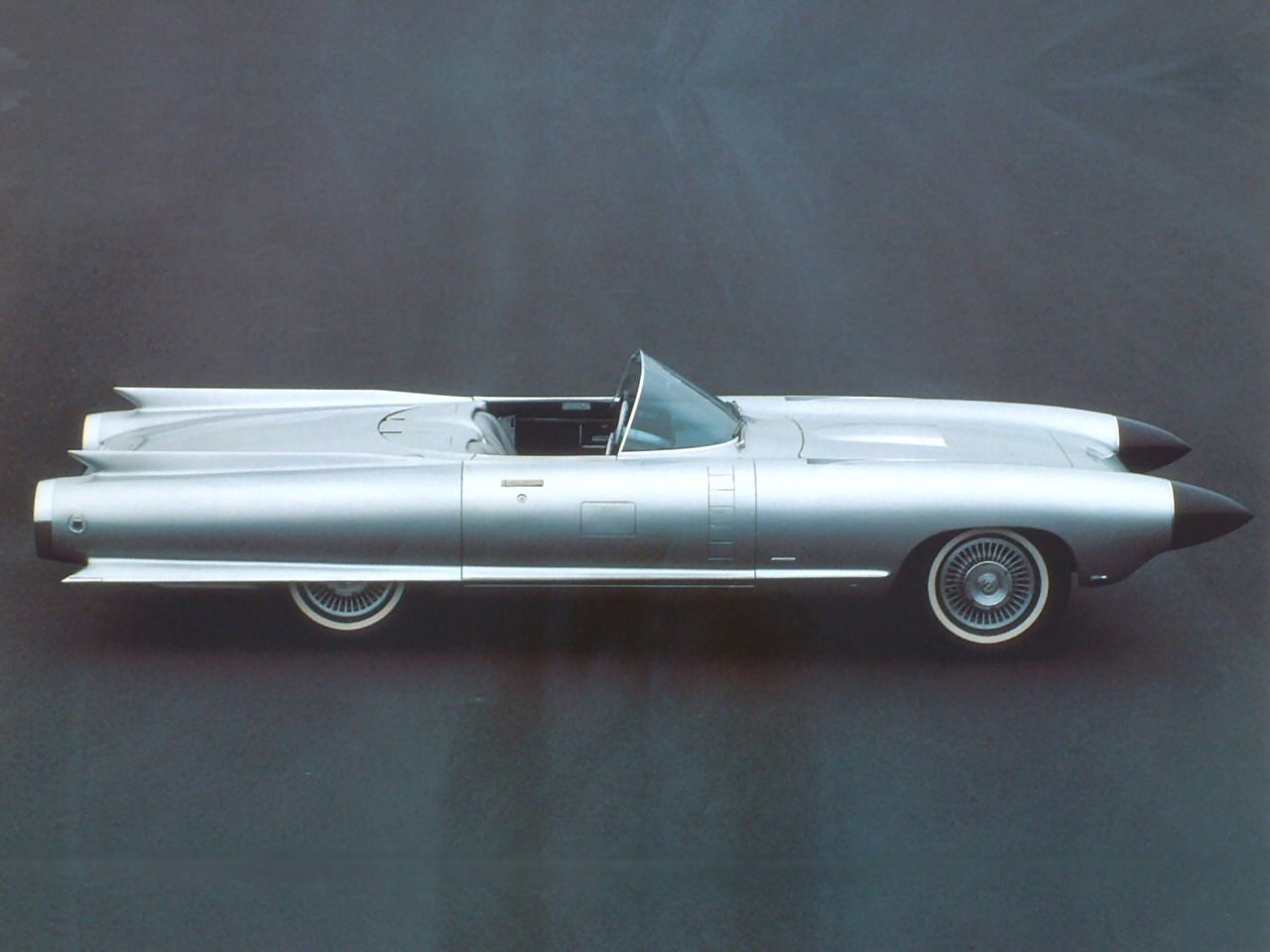
Cadillac Cyclone

The Cadillac Cyclone is a concept car built in 1959 by Cadillac. The Cyclone was never mass-produced as a production model. It currently resides within the GM Heritage Collection.

== Overview ==
One of the last cars designed by Harley Earl, the Cyclone was a testbed for futuristic styling and technology. Built on a 104" wheelbase chassis, it featured a front-mounted 390in^{3} engine, rear-mounted automatic transaxle, and an all-wheel independent suspension. Uniquely, the Cyclone's engine exhaust was ported out just ahead of the front wheels. It also featured a radar-operated collision avoidance system, with the radar sensors mounted in twin "nose-cones" on the front of the car.

Of the Cyclone's stylistic features, the bubble top canopy was the most prominent. Silver coated for UV protection, the canopy automatically opened along with the sliding electrically operated doors. The canopy could also be stowed in the rear compartment, where it rested on a special air-bag base.

The Cyclone's design was heavily inspired by the aviation and rocket designs of the 1950s. The original design of the Cyclone included larger tailfins (similar looking to the 1959 Cadillac lineup), adorned with the logo of the General Motors Air Transport Section (GMATS). These fins were reduced in size in 1964 (and the GMATS logo removed) to look more like the 1963–64 Cadillac range.

== Gallery ==
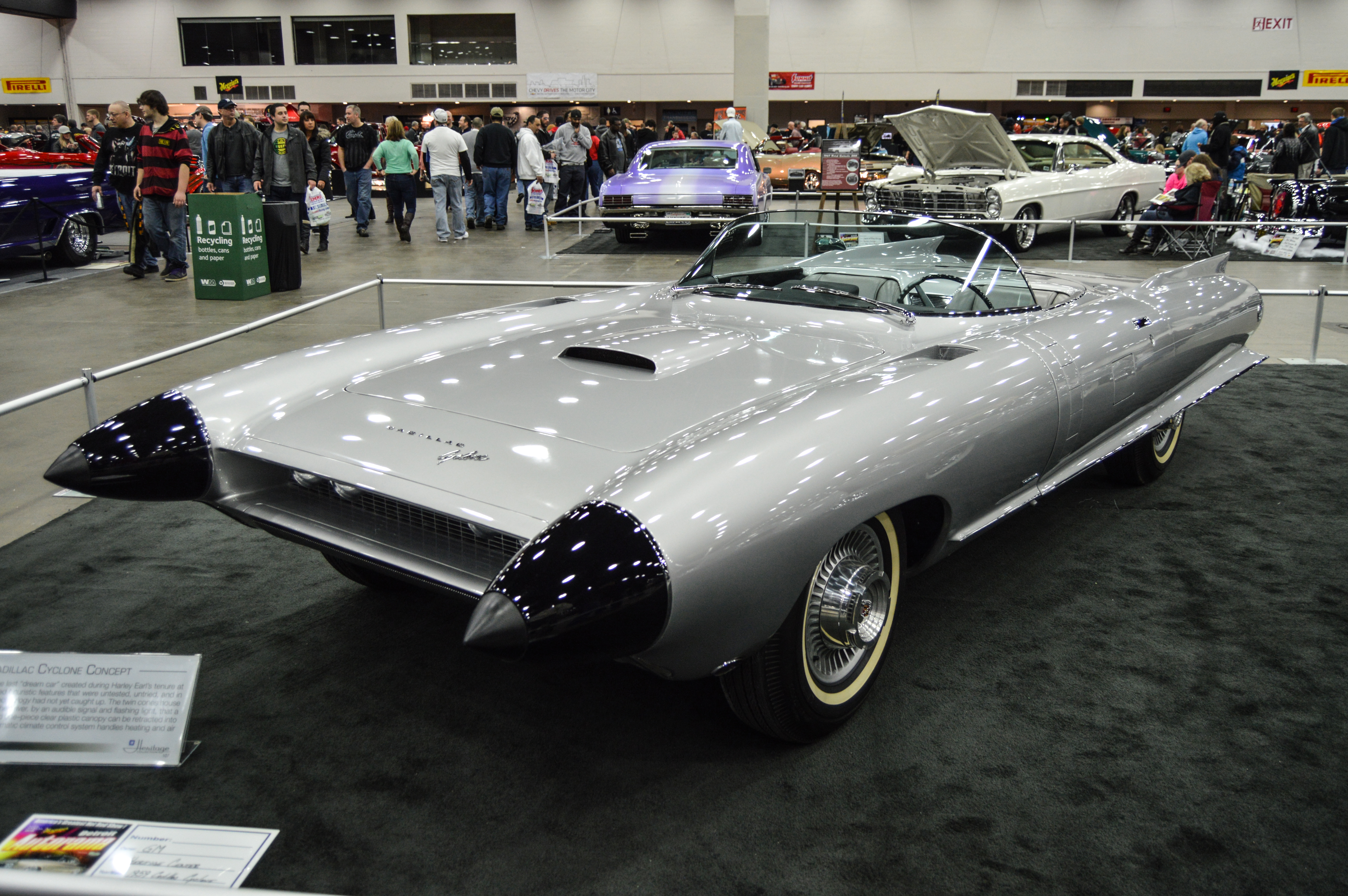

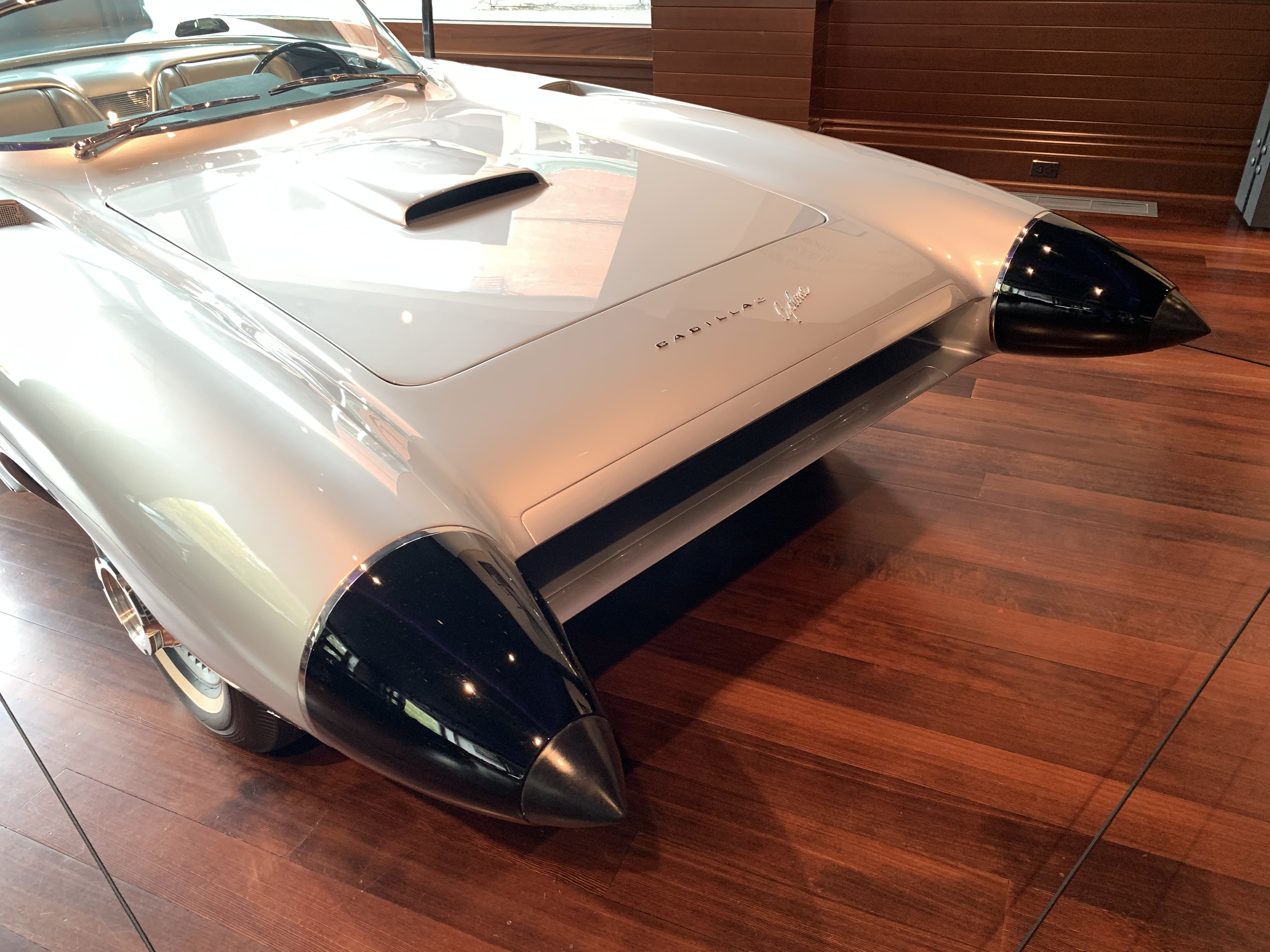
Front view

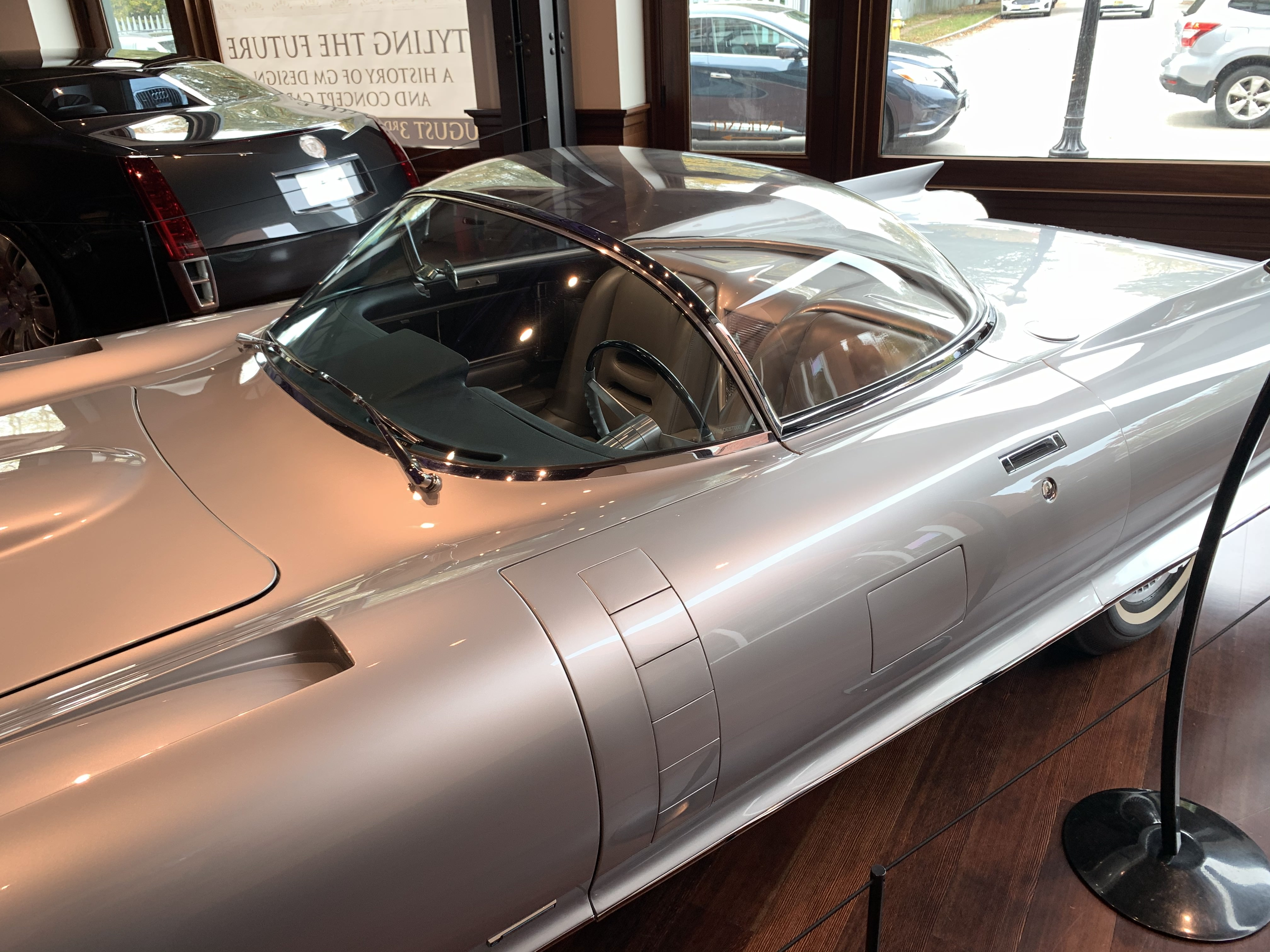
Side view

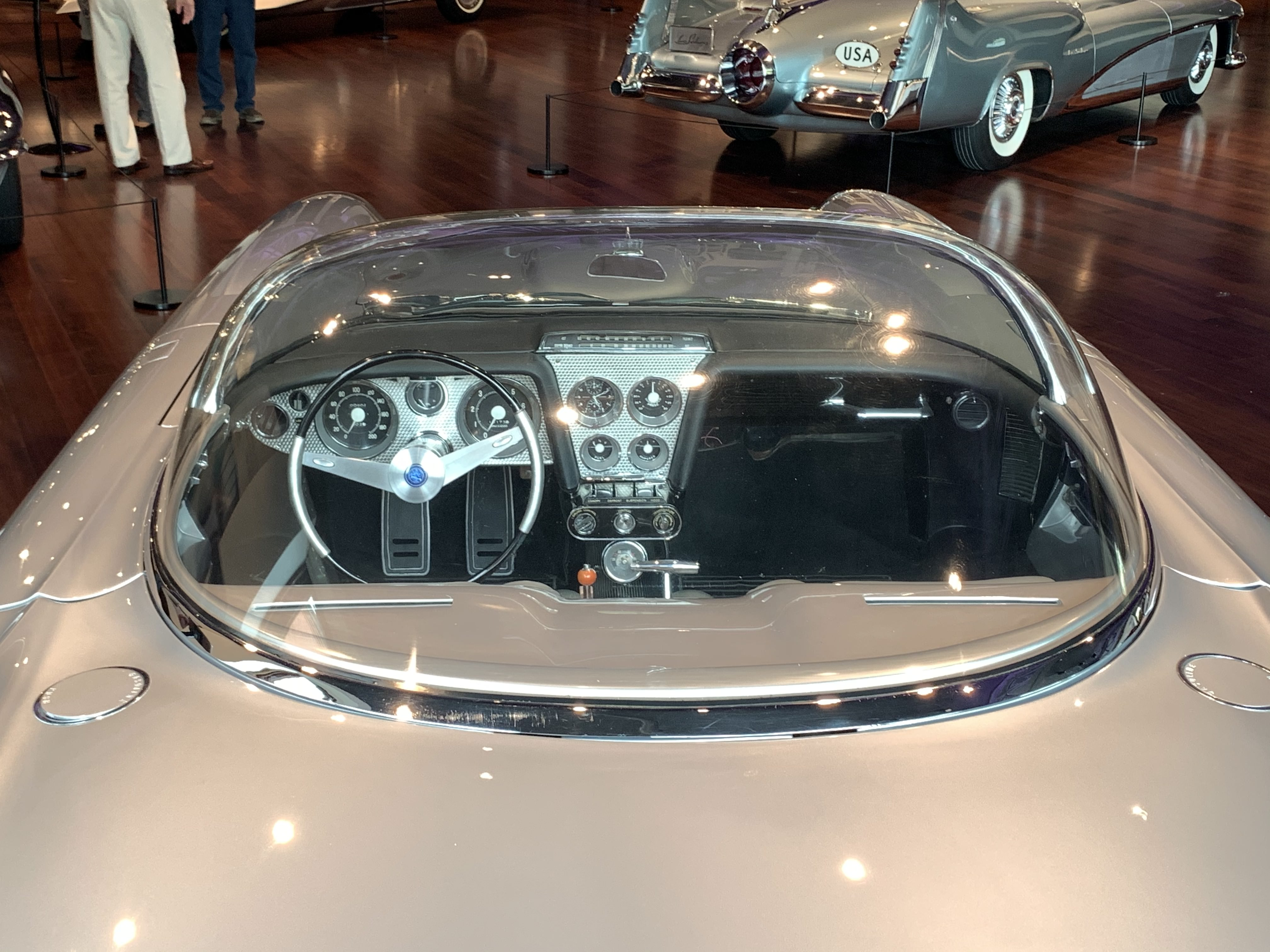
Interior view

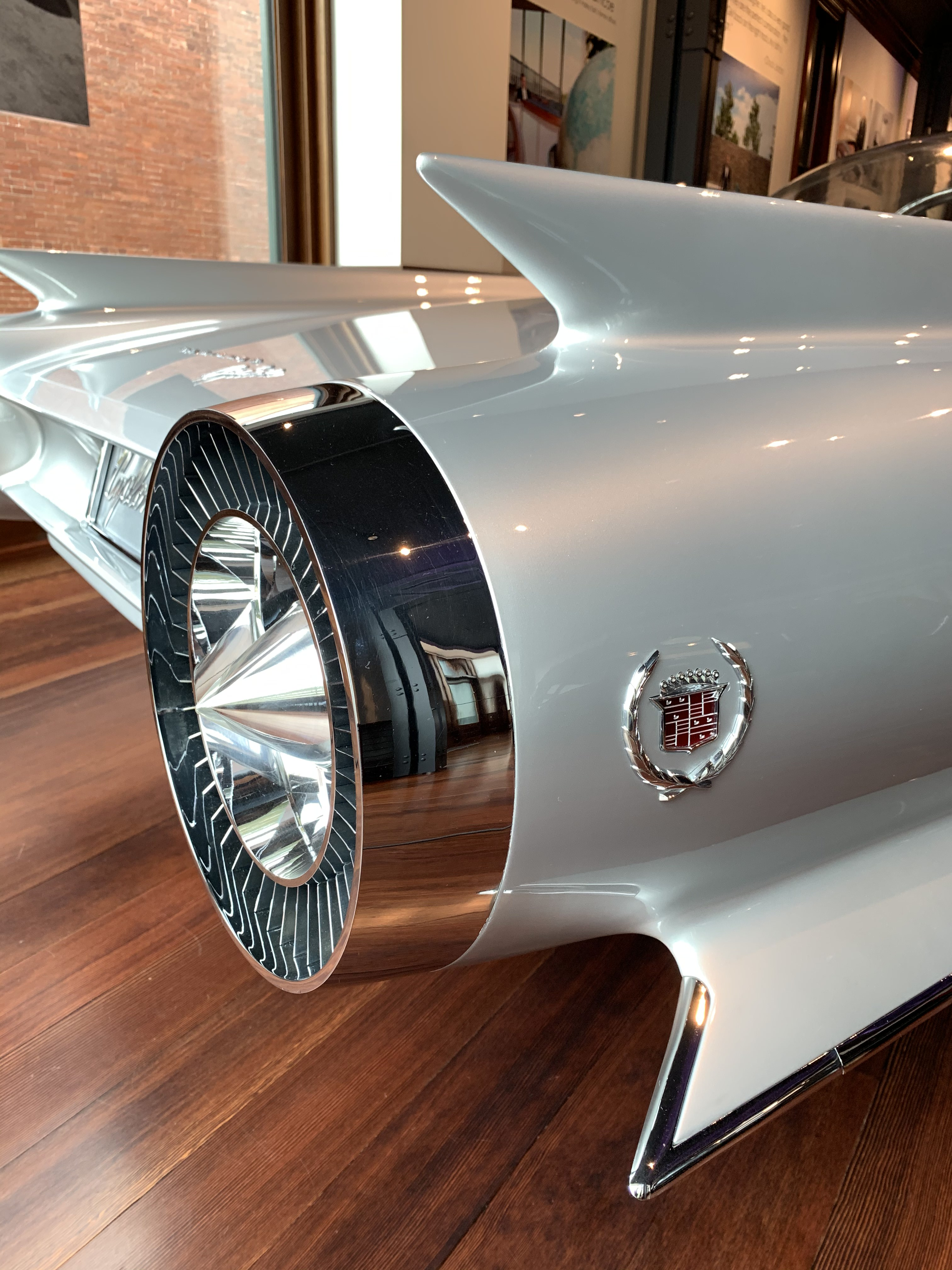
Rear view
