= Pontiac Club de Mer =

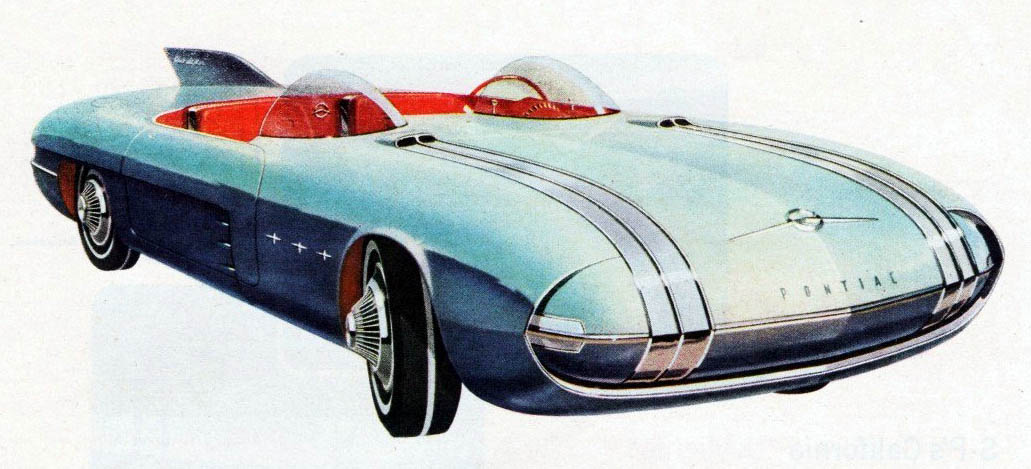

Overview
- Manufacturer: Pontiac (General Motors)
- Also called: XP-200 / SO 2488
- Production: 1956 (one prototype built)

Body and chassis
- Class: Concept sports car
- Body style: 2-door roadster

Powertrain
- Engine: 287 cu in (4,703 cc) Pontiac OHV V8
- Transmission: transaxle

Dimensions
- Wheelbase: 103.251 in (2,623 mm)
- Length: 180.001 in (4,572 mm)
- Height: 38.401 in (975 mm)

Chronology
- Predecessor: Pontiac Strato-Streak
- Successor: Pontiac Banshee

The Pontiac Club de Mer was a purpose-built, experimental car that was built by Pontiac for the General Motors Motorama in 1956 to celebrate General Motors' commitment to futuristic design. The brainchild of GM engineer-designer, Harley Earl (Paul Gillan was also involved, being the Pontiac Studio head at the time), the "de Mer", or French for "of the sea", was a two-door sport roadster that incorporated innovative breakthrough styling like a sleek, low-profile body encasing a large powerplant, a design trend used widely in LSR (land speed record) trials at Bonneville Salt Flats in Utah during the 1950s. One Club de Mer prototype was constructed and unveiled, along with another quarter-scale model, in Miami, Florida. As per GM's "kill order", it was reportedly scrapped in 1958.

Only the model exists today, which was owned by Joseph Bortz of Highland Park, IL. until it was sold to noted car collector Ron Pratt at the 2007 Barrett-Jackson Classic Car Auction for $75,000. A running replica based on a 1959 Pontiac chassis was also built by Marty Martino. Taking three years to complete, it sold for $110,000 at the 2009 Barrett-Jackson Auction in Arizona.

== Design ==
=== Exterior ===
The design of the "de Mer" drew its visual impetus from contemporary aircraft construction of its day, employing a stainless steel monocoque, individual wind screens similar to those on the 1955 Lincoln Futura (later TV's Batmobile), aerodynamically fashioned fascia that flowed down from the hood skin to cover most of the grille, concealed headlights, and a single rear-deck dorsal fin. Also featured were twin "silver-streaks" that flowed into low-profile hood scoops, a carry-over from Pontiac's Bonneville Special two years prior. The overall styling of the body was a smooth, non-undulating profile, similar to an American supersonic jet fighter, with virtually no protrusions or recesses of any kind save for the out-vents on the leading edge of both doors, and the fin. The vehicle had no bumpers, a common feature on most concepts, and the door handles were quite small. On a human scale, its most alarming feature was that it had a very low profile at just under 39 inches (990 mm).

=== Interior ===
The interior styling in the "de Mer" had a barebones functionality to it, more in keeping with its speed trial “airs” than the flashier production vehicles available in showrooms at the time. Instruments were low key, with triangularly configured gauges mounted well behind a three spoke, GT-style steering wheel, around the steering column. The speedometer was positioned on top, and a smaller gauge on either side, each enclosed in its own pod. The interior was finished in red, while passengers gained entry through conventional doors.

=== Design legacy ===
The design of the aerodynamic wind screens was carried over to the 1955 and 1956 Corvette race cars. In the years that followed, the model kit maker Revell made a 1/25 scale Club de Mer that actually came with 1950s-clad driver and passenger.

== Powertrain ==
Under the hood lay Pontiac's brand new V-8 engine, the 287 OHV, which was unveiled the year prior. Called the Strato Streak, it was GM's most powerful engine by 1955 and ushered in Pontiac's high-performance image with the Bonneville, Grand Prix and GTO. This high-output power plant was modified with a high-lift cam and fitted with two four-barrel carburetors to coax power up to a mighty 300 bhp (220 kW). The rear wheels were driven by a rear-mounted transaxle, used later in Pontiac's new compact, the 1961 Tempest, on a DiDion Type rigid rear axle with independent suspension.

Engine	Specifications
Displacement cid / liters	287 / 4.703
Power bhp / kW	300 / 220.8 @ 5100 rpm
Torque ft·lbf / N•m	330 / 447 @ 2600 rpm.
Redline	5500 rpm
Brakes and Tires
Tires	6.40 × 13 whitewalls
Performance
Acceleration 0–60 mph sec.	N/A
Top Speed mph / km/h	N/A

== See also ==
- Oldsmobile Golden Rocket
