= Pontiac Banshee =

Overview
- Manufacturer: General Motors
- Production: 1964–1968 (I–II); 1974 (III); 1988 (IV)

Chronology
- Predecessor: Pontiac Club de Mer
- Successor: Pontiac Rageous

The Pontiac Banshee is a line of concept cars designed by Pontiac, assuming the role previously established by General Motors' Firebirds of the 1950s. Four Banshee "dream cars" were fabricated through 1988 as design exercises intended to establish exterior and interior themes that could be modified for production versions of Pontiac sports and performance cars. Banshee was also the leading candidate for Pontiac's version of the Camaro before being named Firebird in light of any deathly associations of the word Banshee.

== XP-833 "Banshee" ==
Pontiac XP-833 ("Banshee")
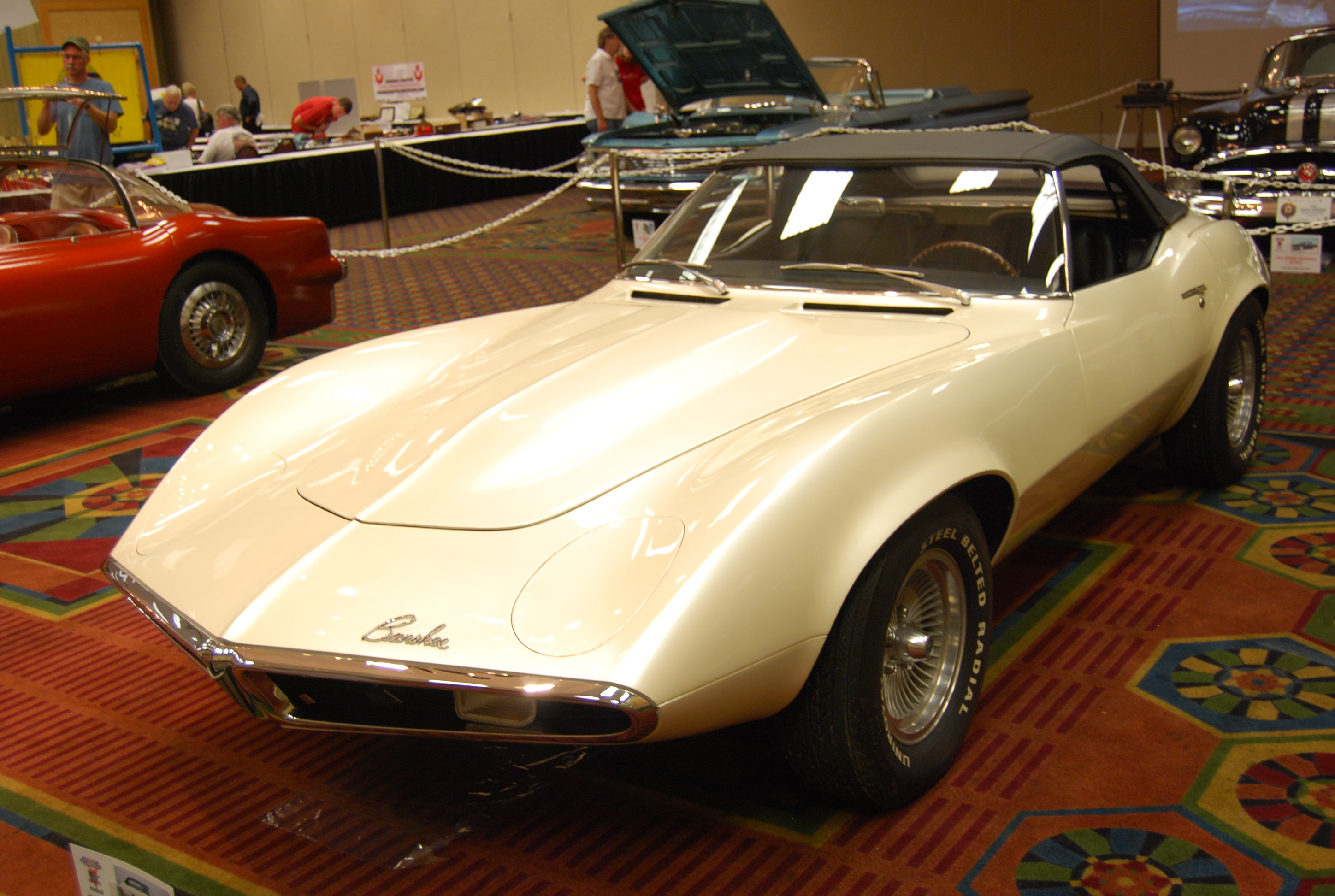

Overview
- Manufacturer: General Motors
- Production: 1964

Chronology
- Predecessor: Pontiac Club de Mer
- Successor: Pontiac Banshee II (1966)

In 1964 Pontiac developed the XP-833 project, a small two-seater with a long, sweeping hood and a short rear deck. Several different versions were constructed, but only two drivable prototypes were ever built. One was a silver hardtop with a straight-six engine and the other is a pearl-white convertible with a V8. A 4-seater version was also developed codenamed XP-851. The Banshee name was retroactively given in 1971 when engineer Bill Collins installed leftover Banshee badges taken from the later XP-798 project; the XP-833 was never referred to as the Banshee during its development.

The styling on these cars is highly reminiscent of what appeared on third-generation Chevrolet Corvettes in 1968, as well as the Opel GT. Another styling cue that made production was the design of the taillights, which are nearly identical to that found on first-generation Pontiac Firebirds. Indeed, the high performance and sensuous styling of the Banshee may have led to its demise, as GM management felt that it would be a threat to the Corvette, cannibalizing its sales, and potentially outperforming it as well. Head of Pontiac John DeLorean called this car the "Mustang Fighter" and rumor has it he fully intended to bring it to production.

This did not sit well with GM execs who had marketed the Corvette as their top performer; even today, models such as the Camaro and Firebird - even though using the same engine as Corvette - have had those engines de-tuned slightly so they will not have as high a horsepower rating as a Corvette. The Banshee would have had equivalent horsepower, yet weighed 500 lb (230 kg) less than the Corvette and so would have been a potent package. It was able to reach 60 mph (97 km/h) in second gear. GM executives instructed DeLorean to cease further development in 1964, though a direct successor was developed as XP-858. In a move loaded with irony, a memo to GM's head of design, Bill Mitchell, dated September 10, 1965, instructed Mitchell to have his staff update the XP-833 exterior clay and interior bucks “reflecting a Chevrolet design for the two-passenger version coupe." And so it was that the XP-833 project was revised to become the C3 Corvette against which it had been forbidden from competing.

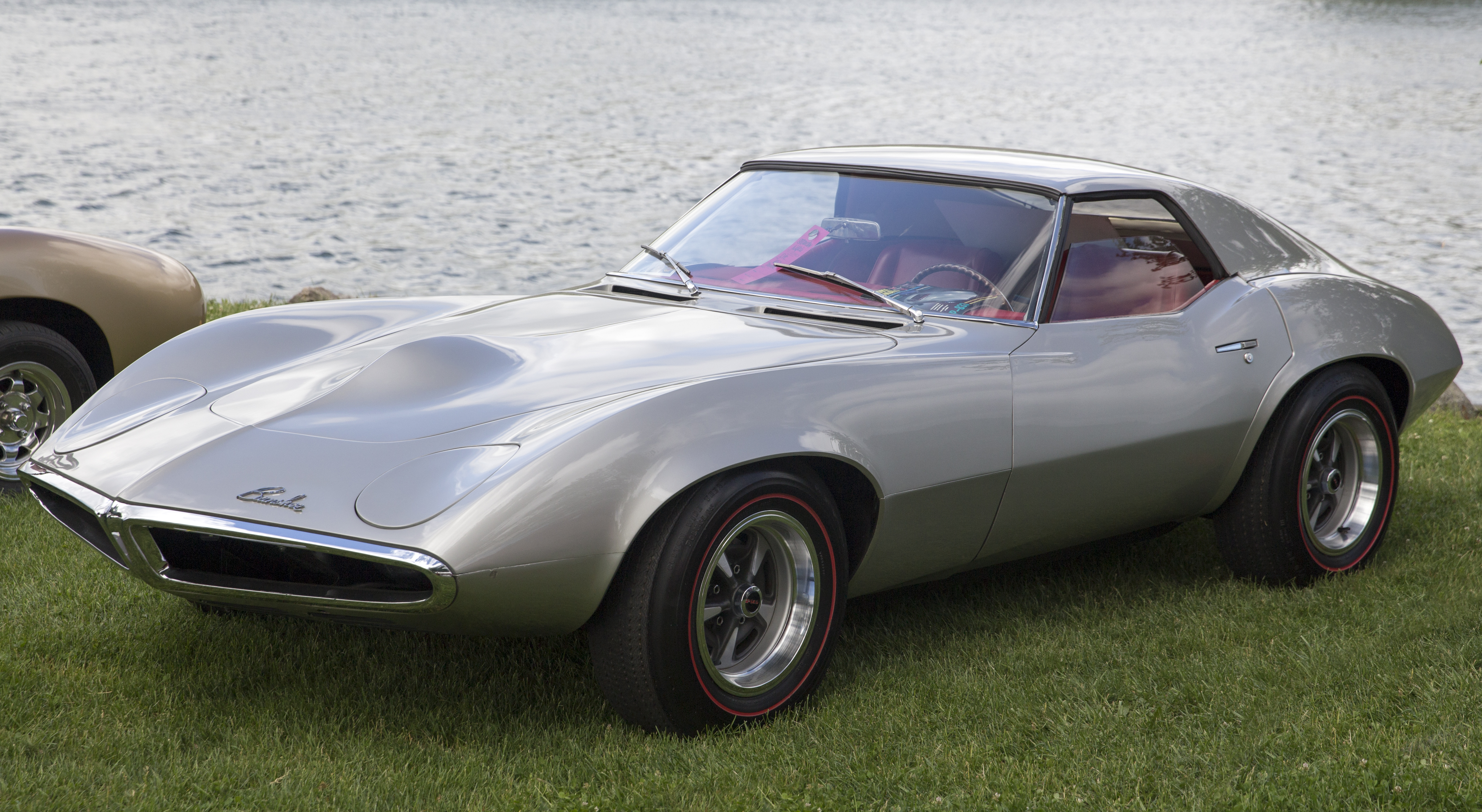
The coupe-bodied XP-833

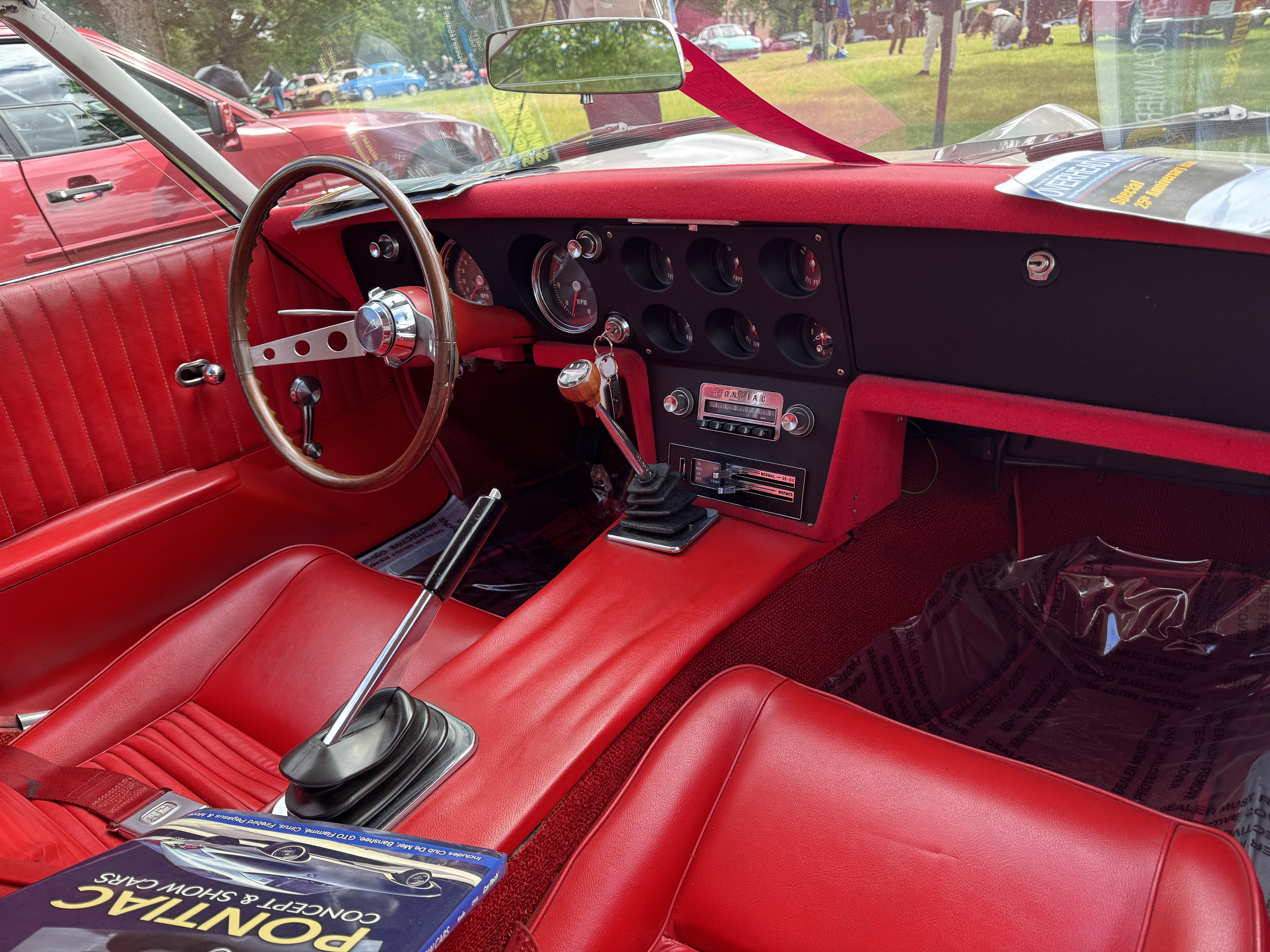
Interior of the hardtop example

== Banshee (XP-798) ==
Codenamed XP-798, the 1966 Pontiac Banshee was a concept car inspired by European grand tourers, which evolved as a 4-seater version of a Corvette competitor study for Pontiac codenamed XP-778. It had a Pontiac 421 V8, 4-wheel independent suspension and featured sliding hinged doors and hinged roof panels for easier rear seat access. It began development in 1962 and was originally intended to be named the Pontiac Scorpion, a name previously associated with a 1961 Pontiac study codenamed XP-758, but was renamed as the Banshee by DeLorean after the fighter plane. A Chevrolet equivalent was also planned in the early stages. It was intended to be displayed at the 1966 New York Auto Show with a press release written, but was pulled from the show at the last minute by James Roche, to the irritation of DeLorean. The Banshee was still worked on for a few years before the project was cancelled and the prototype eventually crushed, though it would donate its badging to the XP-833 prototypes.

== Banshee II ==
Made in 1968, the Banshee II was the second in the Banshee series.

The 1968 Pontiac Banshee II had aerodynamic fiberglass skins over stock Firebird inner panels and a near stock black interior.

In 1969, the Banshee II was modified with white paint and graphics, including a decal on the nose.

It had flush wheel covers, a deep louvered hood, cut down glass, brake cooling vents, minimal ground clearance, and separate headrests for the passengers and the driver. It was powered by a 400 C.I.D. V8 engine.

== Banshee III ==
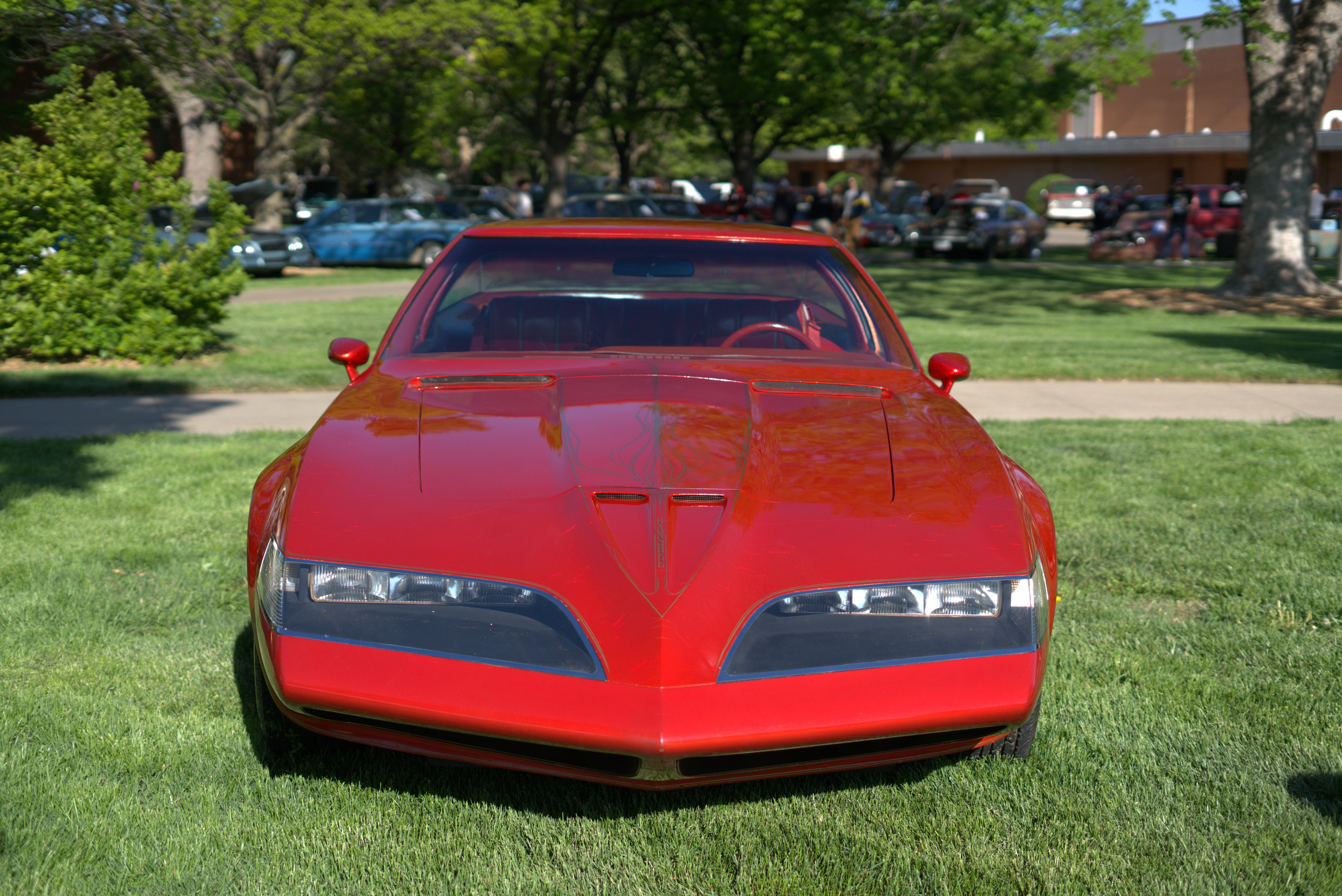
Front view of the Banshee III, taken at the McPherson College annual car show, May 3rd, 2025.

Made in 1974, the Banshee III was the third in the Banshee series. The front end bears some similarities to the later Trans-Ams.

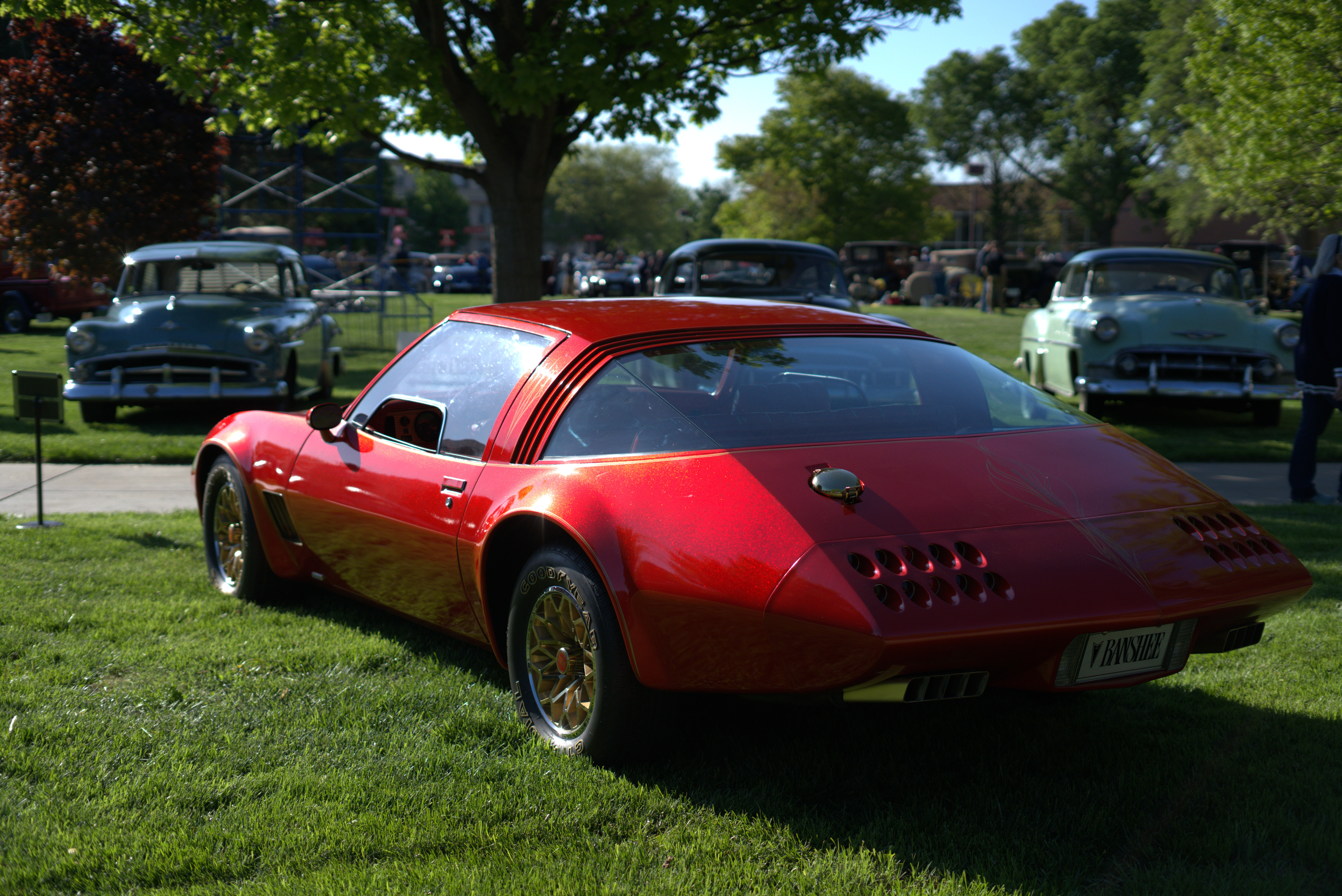
Rear and side view of Pontiac Banshee III, taken at the McPherson College annual car show, May 3rd, 2025.

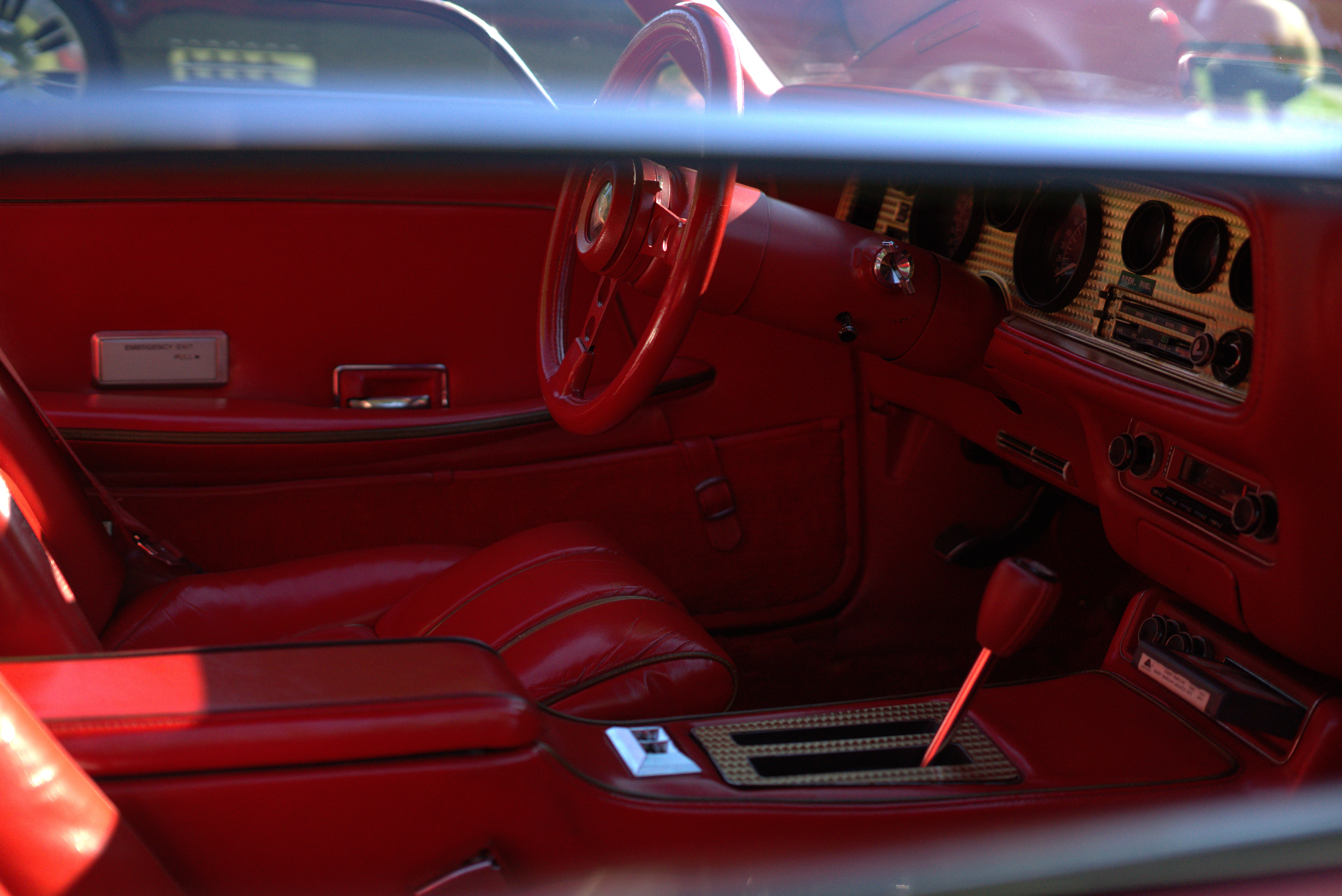
Interior shot of the Banshee III, taken at the McPherson College annual car show, May 3rd, 2025.

The 1974 Pontiac Banshee III was developed from the Pontiac Firebird platform with a long sloping front end and more aerodynamic rear styling. The front was a smooth blend of bumper sheet metal and covered headlamps for improved aerodynamics. The soft face bumper system consisted of body-colored urethane over an energy absorbing foam base, and the quartz halogen rectangular headlamps had a three-beam system, low, freeway and high.

The side glass was fixed and flush to sheet metal for improved aerodynamics and reduced wind noise, and an electrically-operated access panel or toll window, was provided in the fixed side-glass design.

The interior had red leather upholstery. The trunk can be accessed by a hatch, that the rear seats can be folded for additional luggage space and the seat harness system was anchored in the structural seat. The car was powered by a 455 CID Super Duty V8 Pontiac engine.

The metallic maroon Banshee III made its public debut in 1974. It had four slit-style taillights, but these became twenty “high-tech, round-hole” taillights when it was updated in 1976.

== Banshee IV ==
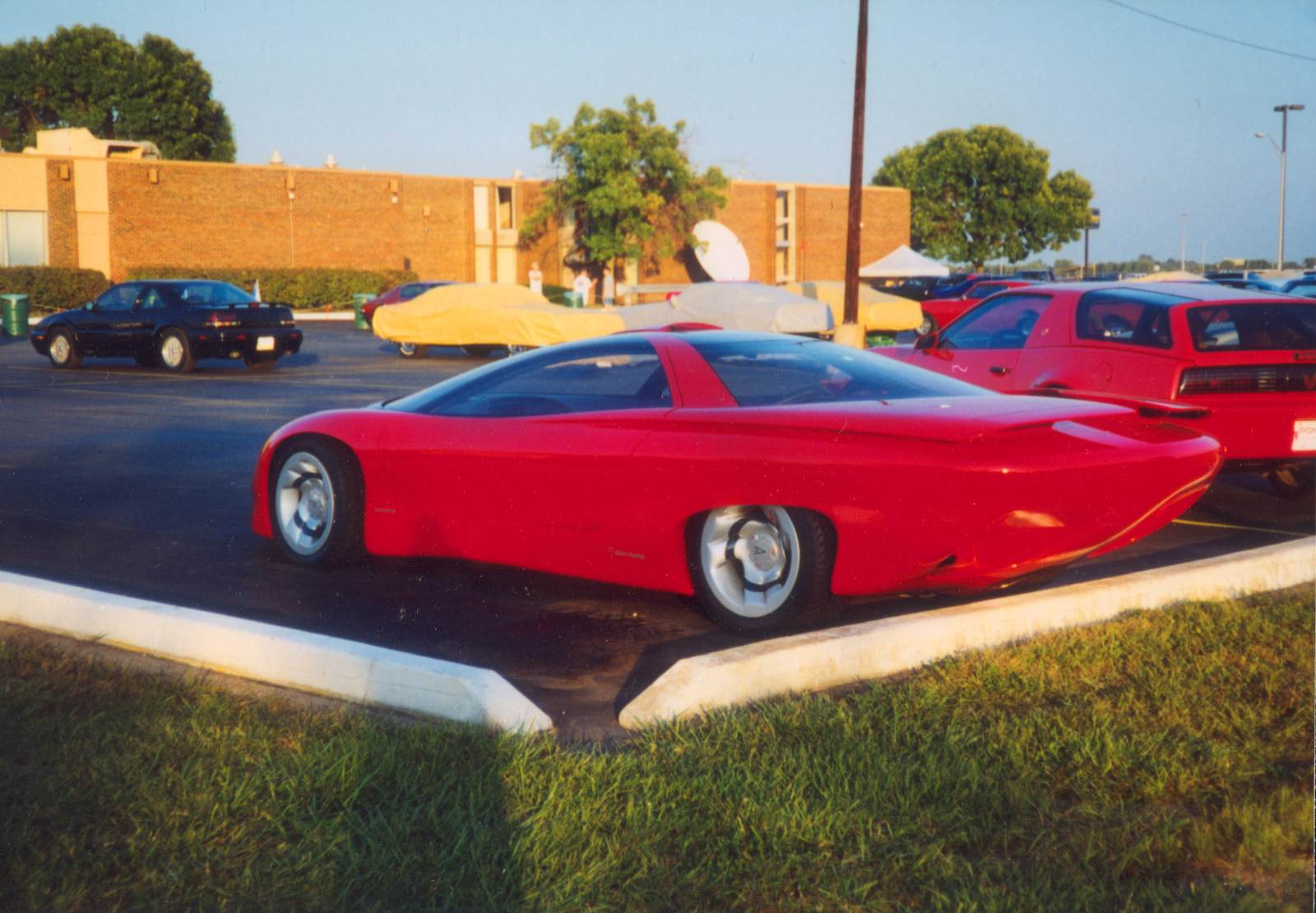
Pontiac Banshee IV parked outside the Dayton airport hotel, mid 1990s.

Known within GM as the "Banshee IV", this car was unveiled in 1988 the two-door, four-seater Banshee IV had a sleek and sensuous futuristic design. Its fiberglass body was painted bright red, while its triangular hood was matte black. A 230 horsepower fuel-injected, single overhead cam V8 engine powered the rear wheels. A heads-up display system (HUD) projected information about speed, engine RPM, and fuel level on the windshield in the driver's field of vision. The dashboard featured video displays and numerous buttons; the steering wheel alone contained about twenty. The dual rear wings were also adjustable. Like its predecessors, it was intended to establish exterior and interior design themes that would be modified for the production version of the Pontiac Firebird. The Banshee IV successfully influenced the overall appearance for the fourth-generation Firebird, as well as extending to the fourth-generation Chevrolet Camaro. It was 201 inches long.

== In media ==
=== Magazine ===
- The March 1989 issue of Motor Trend magazine included a three-page article describing the Banshee IV.

=== Movies and TV series ===
- A vehicle heavily modeled after the Banshee IV appeared as the "Knight Industries 4000" in Knight Rider 2000 (1991) sequel TV movie, although a customized 1991 Dodge Stealth ES was actually used.This car was also reused and featured briefly in the 2001 television series Power Rangers: Time Force.
- The Banshee IV can be seen in the 1989 film Back to the Future Part II.
- The Banshee IV is featured briefly in the 1993 film Demolition Man with several other GM concept cars.

=== Video games ===
- The Banshee XP-833 is featured mobile drag racing game CSR Classics.

=== Scale models ===
- Revell released a 1/25 scale plastic model kit of the Banshee IV.
- Hot Wheels released a 1/64 scale die-cast model of the Banshee IV.

== Surviving Vehicles ==
Both original Pontiac Banshees from 1964 survive today and are in the hands of private collectors. The silver hardtop version of the Banshee was last seen in the classic car section of Napoli Indoor Auto, In Milford, CT, until 2020. In April of that year it was advertised for sale at a Connecticut Kia dealership. It is believed to be one of the two Banshee I vehicles to have survived its multiple owners, as the coupe was acquired by a GM employee after its auto show service life had concluded and began trading hands among collectors once the original owner died in 2006.
