= GM-X Stiletto =

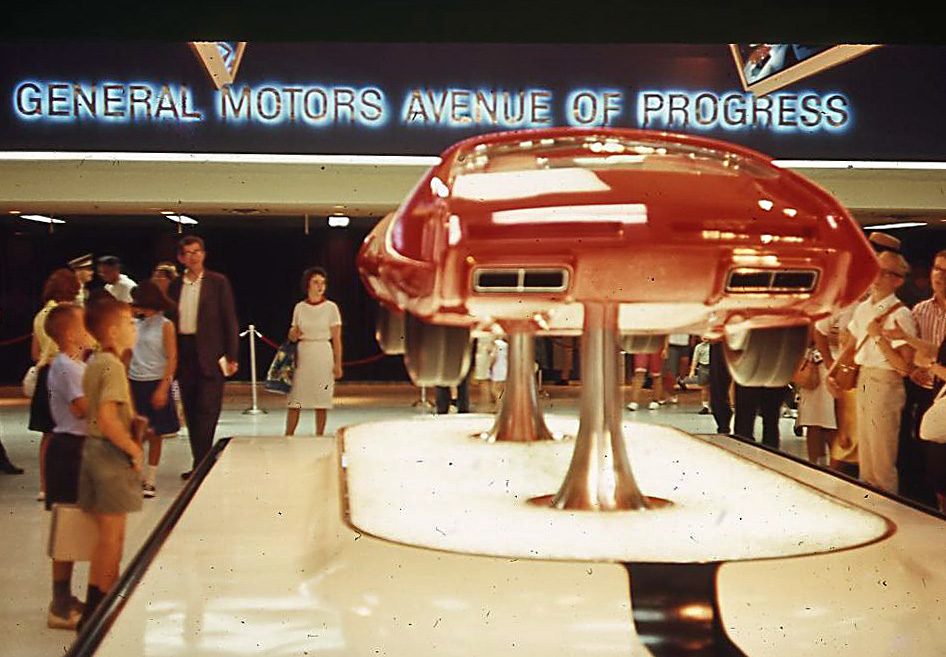
GM-X Stiletto on display at the 1964 NY World's Fair

The GM-X Stiletto was a dream car created by General Motors in 1964. It was designed to have an aerospace design, aircraft steering, a maintenance monitoring system, toggle switch controls, and three way communication speakers. The instrument cluster featured 30 flashing lights, 29 controls and 16 gauges. You entered the car by folding the roof and the rear section up. GM-X Stiletto did not have the powertrain or operable steering and suspension systems, but the rear section was used in a more modest form in the 1967 Cadillac Eldorado. It shares an appearance with the Buick Century Cruiser.
