= General Motors Firebird =

1950s prototype cars by General Motors

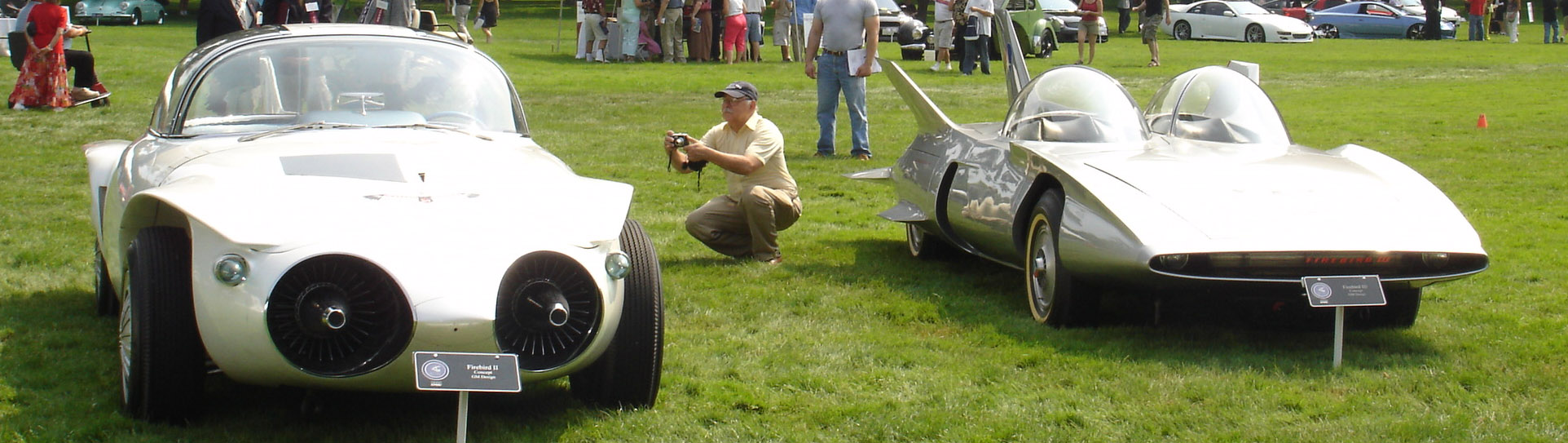
Firebird II (1956, left) and III (1959, right)

The General Motors Firebird comprises a quartet of prototype cars that General Motors (GM) engineered for the 1953, 1956, and 1959 Motorama auto shows. The cars' designers, headed by Harley Earl, took Earl's inspiration from the innovations in fighter aircraft design at the time. General Motors never intended the cars for production, but rather to showcase the extremes in technology and design that the company was able to achieve.

GM preserved the prototype cars at the GM Heritage Center in Sterling Heights, Michigan. Models of the cars are in the permanent collection of the Henry Ford Museum in Dearborn, and the cars still make regular appearances at car shows.

The tradition of offering prototype vehicles continued with the Pontiac Banshee series. From 1967 to 2002, the Pontiac division of GM marketed its Firebird line of pony cars, which had no direct relation to these series of Firebird concept cars.

== History ==
General Motors researched the feasibility of gas turbine engines in cars as early as the 1940s. It was not until the early 1950s that the company began building an actual engine, under the direction of Charles L. McCuen, general manager of General Motors Research Laboratories, with Emmett Conklin leading the project. The fanciful top speed of all four concept cars is "200 MPH."

As these concept cars were not specifically tied to any one division of GM, the Firebird I, II, and III were adorned with the logo of the General Motors Air Transport Section (GMATS).

=== Firebird I ===
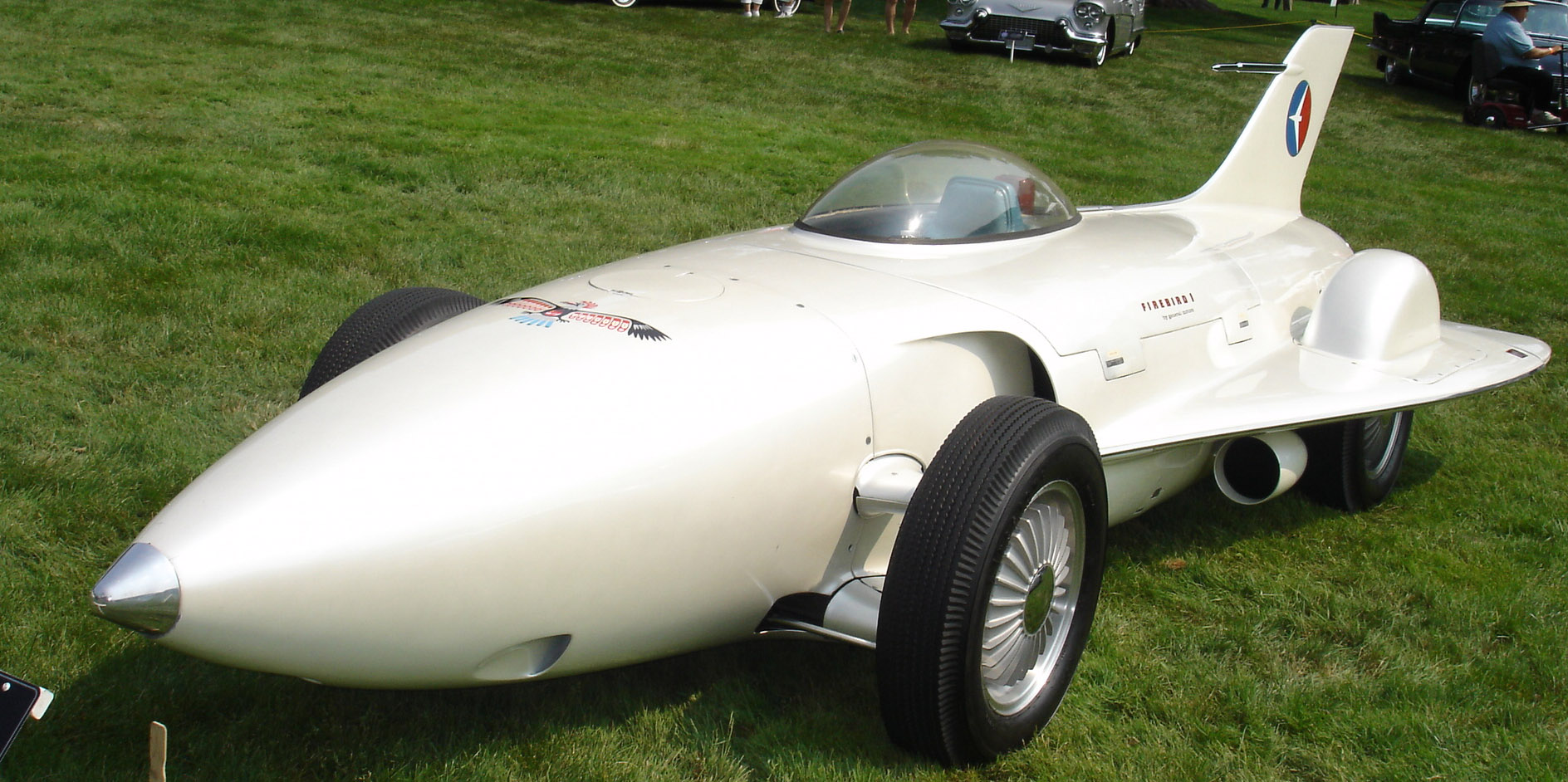
Firebird I

By 1953, the research team had developed the Firebird XP-21. This was later referred to as the Firebird I, which was essentially a jet airplane on wheels. It was the first gas turbine-powered car tested in the United States. The design is entirely impractical, with a bubble-topped canopy over a single-seat cockpit, a bullet-shaped fuselage made entirely of fiberglass, short wings, and a vertical tail fin. It has a 370 hp (280 kW) Whirlfire Turbo Power gas turbine engine, which has two speeds, and expels jet exhaust at some 1,250 °F (677 °C). The weight of the car is 2,500 lb (1,134 kg), with a 100-inch wheelbase.

At first, Conklin was the only person qualified to drive the car, and he tested it up to 100 mph (160 km/h), but upon shifting into second gear the tires lost traction under the extreme engine torque and he immediately slowed down for fear of crashing. Racecar driver Mauri Rose later test drove the car at the Indianapolis Speedway. GM never actually intended to test the power or speed potential of the gas turbine, but merely the practical feasibility of its use. The braking system differs from standard drum systems, in that the drums are on the outside of the wheels to facilitate fast cooling—and the wings actually have aircraft-style flaps for slowing from high speed.

A miniature version of the Firebird I crowns the Harley J. Earl Trophy, given to the winner of the Daytona 500.

=== Firebird II ===
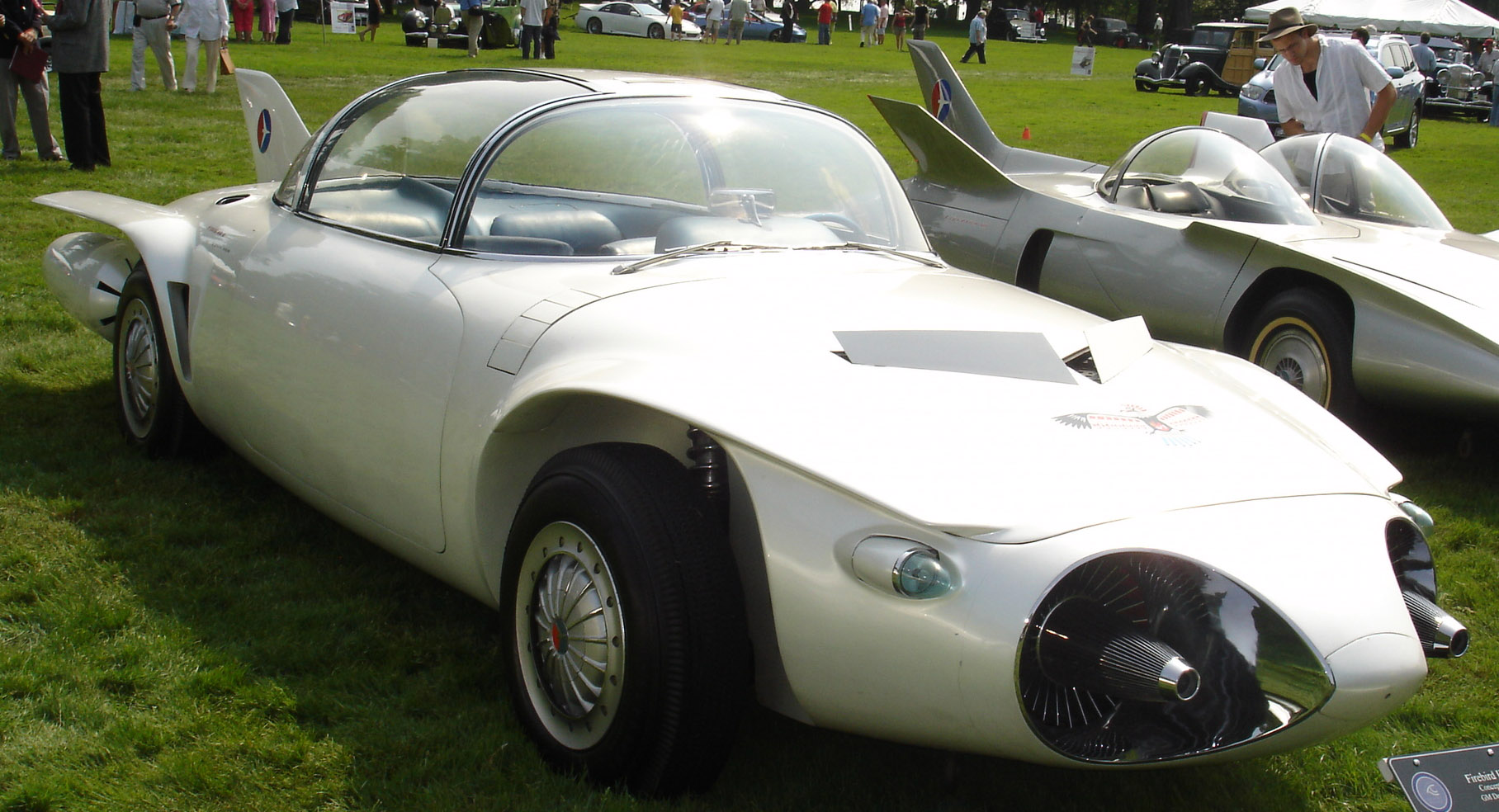
Firebird II

The second concept car, the Firebird II of 1956, was designed as a four-seat, family car. It has a low and wide design with two large air intakes at the front, a high bubble canopy top, and a vertical tail fin. Its exterior bodywork is made entirely of titanium. The engine output is 200 hp (150 kW). To solve the exhaust heat problem, the car feeds the exhaust through a regenerative system, allowing the engine to operate nearly 1,000 °F (538 °C) cooler, and also powers the accessories. Capable of using different types of fuel, the most common is Kerosene.

The concept car was also the first use by General Motors of disc brakes on all four wheels, along with a fully independent suspension. It also featured a non-operational guidance system intended for use with "the highway of the future," where an electrical wire embedded in the roadway would send signals that would help guide cars and avoid accidents. This car appears in GM's sponsored-film short "Design for Dreaming".

Specifications

- GM internal code: XP-43
- Wheelbase: 120 in (3,048 mm)
- Length; 234.7 in (5,961 mm)
- Ground clearance: 5.5 in (140 mm)

=== Firebird III ===
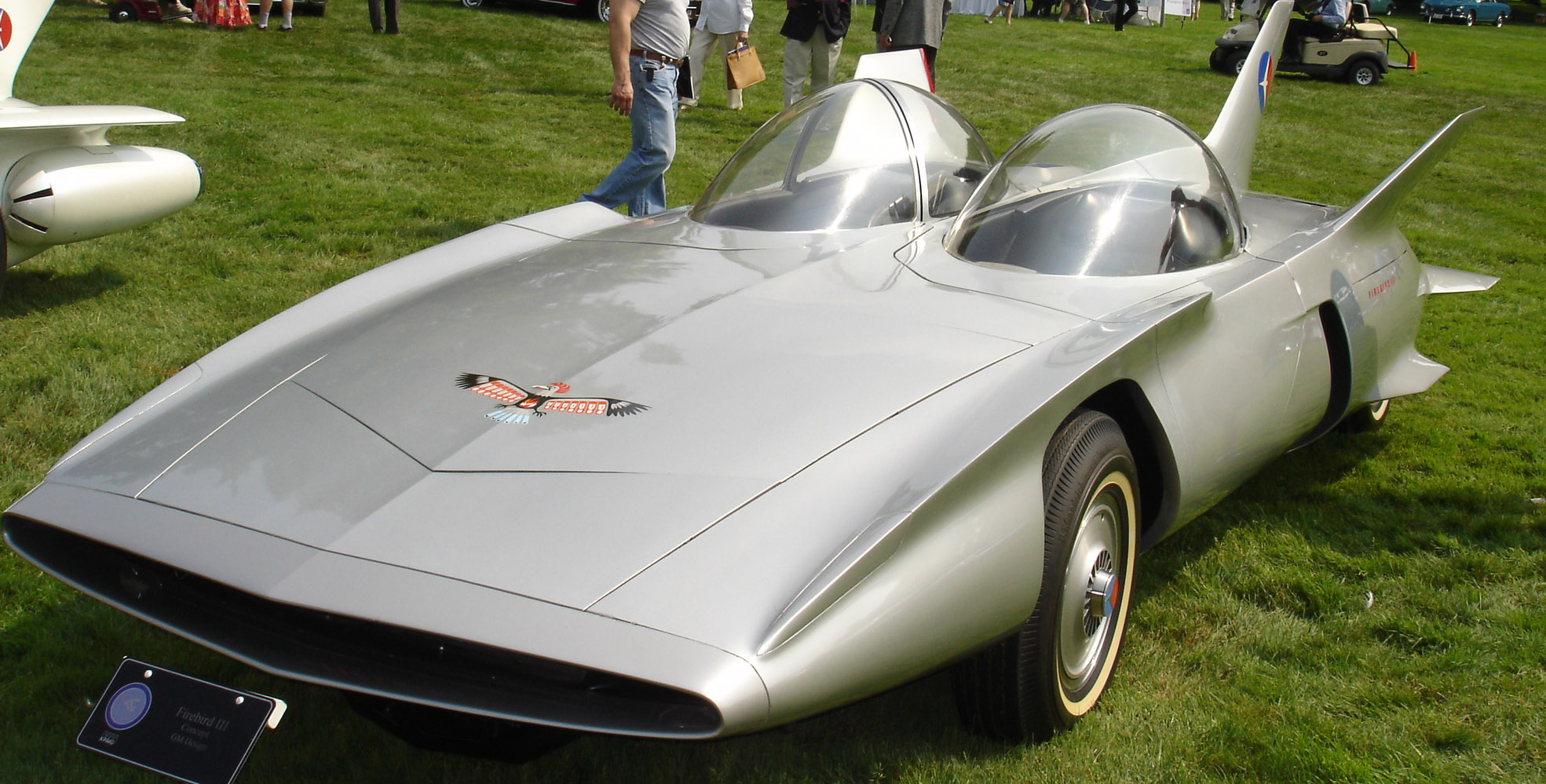
Firebird III

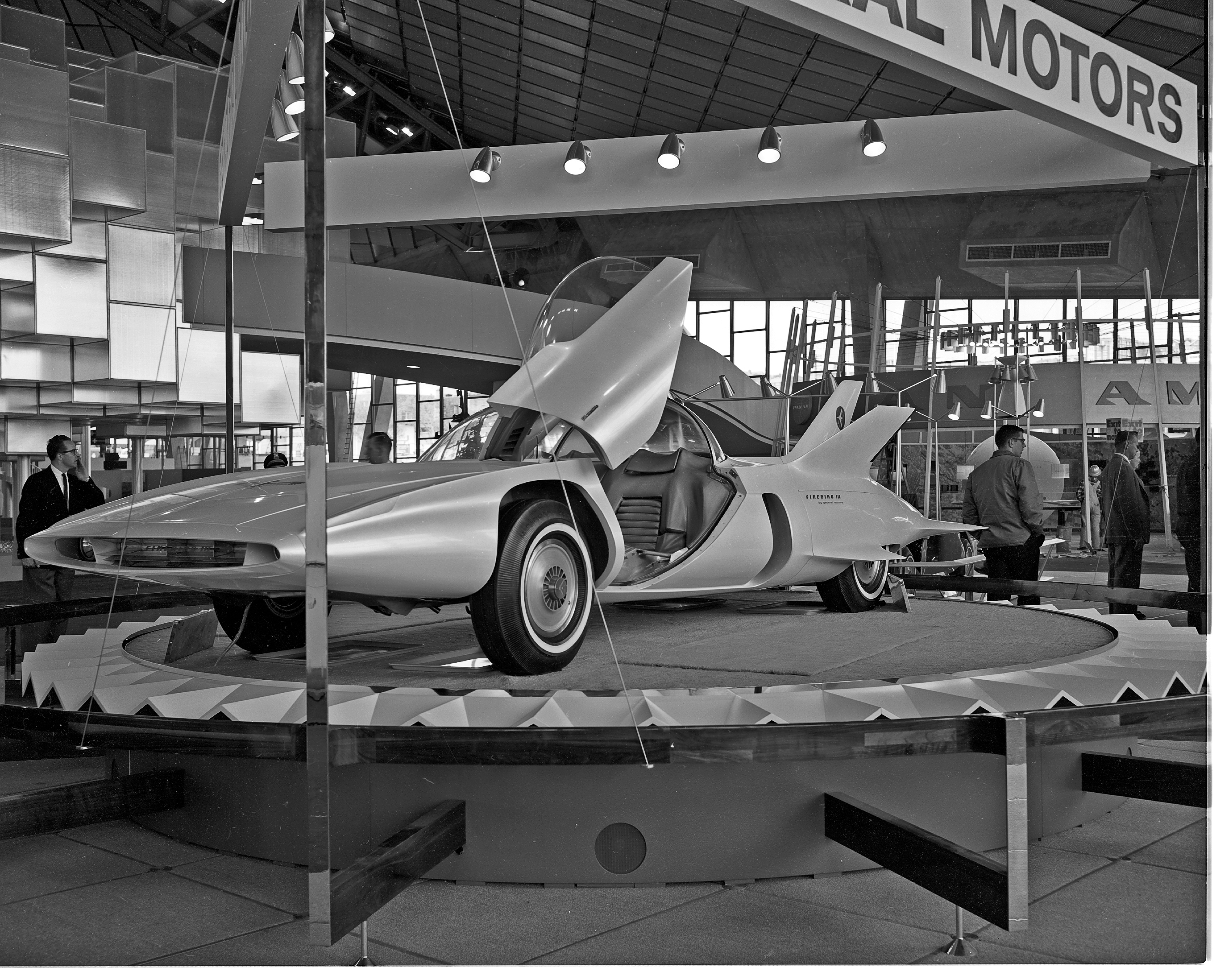
Firebird III on display at the Century 21 Exposition, Seattle, 1962

The Firebird III debuted at Motorama in 1959. The concept car featured a fiberglass body with seven short wings and tail fins. It is a two-seater powered by a 225 hp (168 kW) Whirlfire GT-305 gas turbine engine, with a two-cylinder 10 hp (7.5 kW) gasoline engine to run all the accessories. Its exterior design features a double-bubble canopy and included cruise control, anti-lock brakes, and air conditioning. It also featured air drag brakes similar to those found on aircraft that emerged from flat panels in the bodywork of the car to slow it from high speeds; an "ultra-sonic" key that signaled the doors to open; an automated guidance system to help avoid accidents; and a "no hold" steering system. The car's steering was controlled by the driver by a joystick positioned between the two seats.

Specifications

- GM internal code: XP-73
- Wheelbase: 119 in (3,023 mm)
- Length: 248.2 in (6,304 mm)
- Height: 44.8 in (1,138 mm) (canopy top)
- Ground clearance: 5.3 in (135 mm)

=== Firebird IV ===
The Firebird IV debuted at the 1964 New York World's Fair, in the General Motors Futurama Exhibit. It was another sleek, aircraft-inspired, turbine-engined "future" design, which GM coded internally as the XP-790. Its designers conceived it for a future in which cars steered automatically via programmed guidance systems, to "ensure absolute safety at more than twice the speed possible on expressways of the day." Though billed as being turbine-powered, the Firebird IV was non-functional. GM repackaged the Firebird IV for the 1969 show circuit as the Buick Century Cruiser. Reportedly, the show car was crushed in the 1980s.

Specifications

- Wheelbase: 119"
- Overall length: 229.8"
- Width: 77.6"
- Height: 45"

== Motorama theme (1956) ==
Key to the Future

The 1956 Motorama movie Key to the Future projected a vision of the future. It shows a nuclear family that are hot and perspiring in a convertible on their way to a day at the beach, but they are stuck in a freeway traffic jam. In a flashforward to the future, they are cruising at a high-speed in air-conditioned comfort along an automated freeway with no other vehicles (except once a Firebird I) to be seen in a turbine-powered Firebird II. The movie's concept was that General Motors would provide such a future.

An example of this type of forecast is the approach in vehicle infrastructure integration using electronic vehicle control and improved highway infrastructure.

== Whirlfire gas turbines ==
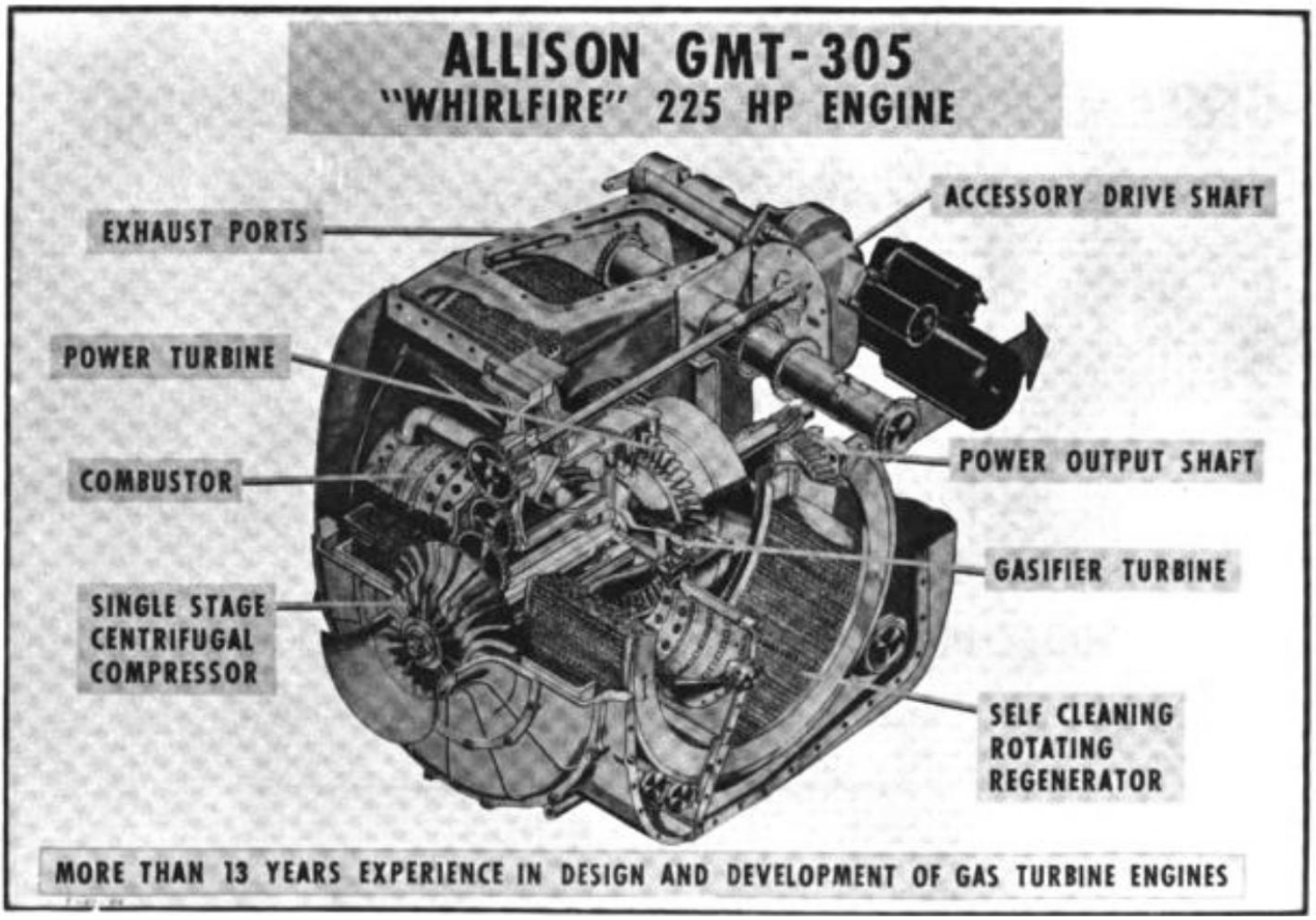
Cutaway of the Allison GMT-305, the commercialized derivative of the GT-305 Whirlfire gas turbine

The Whirlfire gas turbine engines fitted to the Firebird concept cars and other GM concept buses and trucks are free-turbine turboshaft machines with two spools: one compressor/gasifier turboshaft and one power/output turboshaft sharing a common axis without a mechanical coupling between them. Initially, the first engines developed (GT-300 and 302) did not have a regenerator, but adding regeneration to recapture heat from the exhaust gases was found to reduce fuel consumption by 1/2 in the second-generation GT-304 fitted to Firebird II, so subsequent generations of GM Whirlfire turbines incorporated a regenerator.

The single-stage rotary compressor pushes compressed air out radially into the combustors, where it is mixed with fuel and burned, and the resulting combustion gases are expanded through first the gasifier turbine, which is on the same shaft and is used to drive the rotary compressor, then through the power turbine, which is on the output shaft. The power shaft speed is stepped down through reduction gearing at the output shaft to make it compatible with automotive components. An accessory shaft is driven from the gasifier/compressor shaft for engine ancillaries, including a gear-type lubrication oil pump.

For the GT-304 and subsequent engines, the rotating drum regenerators are arranged to either side of the turboshafts in the side compartments. Within the compartments, a vertical bulkhead divides the regenerators into low-pressure exhaust (occupying approximately 2/3 of the regenerator) and high-pressure inlet (the remaining 1/3) sections. As the exhaust section of the regenerator passes through the exhaust gases, it picks up waste heat, then rotation brings it into the inlet section, where the heat is transferred to the compressed air. The regenerators turn at approximately 30 RPM. In addition to improving thermodynamic efficiency, the regenerators serve to muffle engine noise and heat, reducing exhaust temperatures.

Because the Whirlfire engines are free-turbine machines, maximum torque is developed when the output shaft is stalled (not turning), and is approximately double the torque developed at full power output. In addition, the minimum specific fuel consumption, and thus highest efficiency, is achieved at full power.

=== Models ===
The first engine, carrying an internal designation of GT-300 (1953), did not have a regenerator. The GT-300 had an output of 370 hp (280 kW) when the gasifier (compressor) turbine was spinning at 26,000 RPM and the free (power) turbine was spinning at 13,000 RPM. The weight of the entire engine unit was 775 lb (352 kg). With a second burner, the engine was re-designated GT-302 and fitted to Firebird I (XP-21). Brake-specific fuel consumption (BSFC) was a notable issue, which at 1.63 lb/hp·h was significantly greater than that of a comparable Detroit Diesel 8V71 diesel engine (approximately 0.40 lb/hp·h), even though the turbine was 1,500 lb (680 kg) lighter. Other planned improvements would target throttle lag, caused by accelerating the gasifier turbine to peak speed, and lack of engine braking.

GT-304 (1956) was the first GM gas turbine to include a regenerator, which used exhaust heat to warm intake air, improving fuel consumption to 0.77 lb/hp·h. As fitted to Firebird II, GT-304 output was 200 hp (150 kW) at a gasifier turbine speed of 35,000 RPM. The gasifier turbine idled at 15,000 RPM and the power turbine operated at up to 28,000 RPM. Overall compression ratio in the gasifier stage was 3.5:1.

The GT-305 (1958) fitted to Firebird III had an output of 225 hp (168 kW) (at turbine speeds of 33,000 RPM gasifier / 27,000 RPM power) and weight of 600–650 lb (270–290 kg). With a regenerator and additional component refinements, GT-305 achieved a brake-specific fuel consumption of 0.55 lb/hp·h. The engine was redesignated GMT-305 in 1959 and further development for regular production was handed off from GM Research to Allison Engine Company.

== See also ==
- Chevrolet Turbo Titan III (1965) equipped with a derivative gas turbine engine
- Chrysler Turbine Car, a consumer prototype gas turbine design by the Chrysler Corporation
- DeltaWing
- Rover-BRM
- Fiat Turbina
- Renault Etoile Filante
