= Cadillac Orleans =

Concept car developed by Cadillac

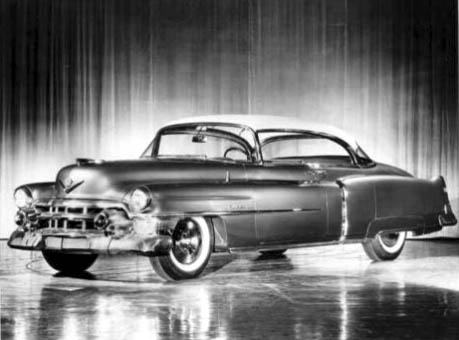

Overview
- Manufacturer: General Motors
- Production: (none)
- Model years: 1953
- Assembly: Detroit

Body and chassis
- Class: Concept car
- Body style: 4-door hardtop

The Cadillac Orleans was a concept car designed by Cadillac for the 1953 auto show circuit. It was the first four-door hardtop concept. The hardtop design eliminated the traditional B-pillar found on most cars of the era. Powered by a Cadillac V8 engine with an output of 210 hp (157 kW), the Orleans was never put into production. The design innovations on this car would not be put into a production car until the 1956 Sedan de Ville. The car also featured suicide doors, a wrap around windshield, full air conditioning, and several safety improvement attempts, such as a feature which resulted in the doors only being able to be opened if the car was in neutral. Another unique luxury feature was the addition of an AC/DC converter and a normal household outlet to allow electronic devices to be plugged into the car. A compartment in the backrest held a men's electric razor, a vanity case, and a mirror.
