= Marc Breaux =

American actor

Marc Breaux (November 3, 1924 – November 19, 2013) was an American choreographer and occasional film director best known for his work on musical films of the 1960s and 1970s. Most of his well-known work was in collaboration with Dee Dee Wood to whom he was married for many years. Much of Breaux's best recognized work was also in collaboration with the songwriting Sherman Brothers.

In 1948 he appeared on Broadway in the original cast of Kiss Me, Kate at the New Century Theatre in New York City and in 1958 he appeared in Li'l Abner at the St. James Theatre, also in New York City. Marc Breaux with Dee Dee Wood, choreographed the Broadway musical Do-Re-Mi, from 1960 through 1962.

Following some health issues in the late 1970s, Breaux went to work for ex-producer Nick Vanoff at Vanoff's Hollywood post-production company Complete Post. Breaux was videotape operator for the company for nearly 20 years until his retirement in the mid-1990s.

== Filmography ==
- Design for Dreaming (1956) dancer
- The Andy Williams Show (1962) TV Series (choreographer) (1962–1963)
- Judy and Her Guests, Phil Silvers and Robert Goulet (1963) (TV) (choreographer)
- "The Hollywood Palace", (1964–1970) (TV) (choreographer-director)
- The King Family Show (1965/66) (TV) (director-choreographer)
- Mary Poppins (1964) (choreographer), voice of singing cow
- The Sound of Music (1965) (choreographer)
- The Happiest Millionaire (1967) (stager: musical numbers)
- Chitty Chitty Bang Bang (1968) (choreographer)
- Of Thee I Sing (1972) (TV) (choreographer)
- Huckleberry Finn (1974) (choreographer)
- The Slipper and the Rose (1976) (choreographer)
- Sextette (1978) (choreographer)
