= Design for Dreaming =

- Directed by: Victor D. Solow
- Written by: Joseph March
- Produced by: Victor D. Solow
- Starring: Thelma Tadlock; Marc Breaux; Marjorie Gordon; Joseph Lautner
- Cinematography: Victor D. Solow; Stanley Meredith; Rex C. Wimpy
- Edited by: Reva Schlesinger
- Music by: Sol Kaplan
- Production company: MPO Productions
- Distributed by: General Motors
- Release date: 1956
- Country: United States
- Language: English

Design for Dreaming

Design for Dreaming is a 1956 industrial short or sponsored film produced to accompany the General Motors Motorama show that year. A ballet with voiceover dialogue, it features a woman (danced by Tad Tadlock and voiced by Marjorie Gordon) who dreams about a masked man (danced by Marc Breaux and sung by Joseph Lautner) taking her to the Motorama at the Waldorf-Astoria Hotel and to Frigidaire's "Kitchen of the Future".

The film begins in the woman's bedroom, with the masked man suddenly appearing. He then takes her to the Motorama. After looking at several cars including Buick, Chevrolet Corvette, Oldsmobile, and Cadillacs, she is taken to the "kitchen of the future", where she bakes a cake. She then goes back to the Motorama and dances the "dance of tomorrow". After looking at more cars, she and her masked man (who unmasks himself) travel on the "road of tomorrow" in the "Firebird II."

In the late 20th century the film emerged as a cult classic, appreciated as an epitome of mid-century corporate futurism.

== History ==
Tad Tadlock and Marc Breaux in "Design for Dreaming"

The film was produced and directed by Victor Solow for MPO Productions, stars Tad Tadlock and Marc Breaux, and features the voice of Thurl Ravenscroft. The original music was by Sol Kaplan. It was shot in 16mm Anscocolor. GM sponsored a sequel, A Touch of Magic, for the last Motorama in 1961.

== In popular culture ==
The short was included in a fifth-season episode of the television series Mystery Science Theater 3000. In a related comedy sketch, the unnamed female lead is given the name "Nuveena, the Woman of the Future", and portrayed by Bridget Jones Nelson, who reprised the role in a handful of sketches in subsequent episodes.

The BBC documentary series Pandora's Box by Adam Curtis made extensive use of clips from Design for Dreaming, especially in the title sequence.

Excerpts from this public domain film also were featured in Michael Moore's Capitalism: A Love Story. Part of the film, with dialogue, is played during the opening titles for The Hills Have Eyes. Some snippets (without dialogue) are played in the video watched by Michael Douglas during his physical in The Game and in the opening titles for The Stepford Wives (2004).

Some footage was also used in the music video for Peter Gabriel's 1987 single "In Your Eyes", Rush's 1989 music video for "Superconductor", a 1989 commercial for the Nintendo Game Boy game Super Mario Land, a 1994 commercial for Power Macintosh, and during Nine Inch Nails concert performances.

== Voices ==
- Tad Tadlock as Woman
- Marc Breaux as Man
- Thurl Ravenscroft as Singer

== See also ==
- Home of the future
