= 1959 Cadillac =

1959 Cadillac may refer to:

- Third generation Cadillac Eldorado (in production from 1959 to 1966)
- Fifth generation Cadillac Series 62 (1959-1964)
