= Chevrolet Code 130R =

Chevrolet concept vehicle

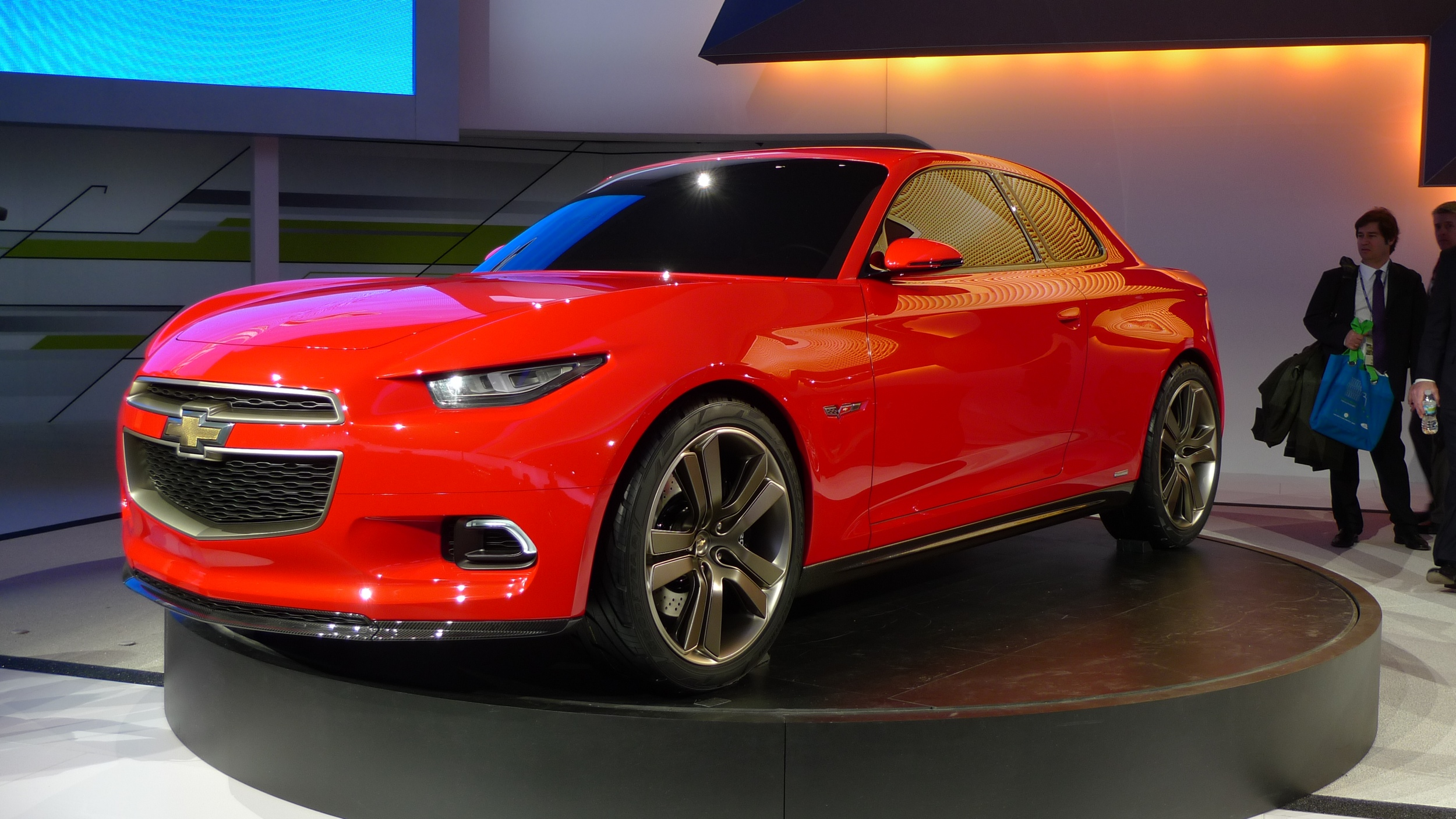
- 2012 Chevrolet Code 130R at the North American International Auto Show (front)

Overview
- Manufacturer: Chevrolet
- Production: 2012 (3 produced)
- Designer: Joe Baker

Body and chassis
- Class: Sports car (S)
- Body style: 2-door coupe
- Layout: Front-engine, rear-wheel drive (FR)
- Platform: GM Alpha
- Related: Cadillac ATS; Cadillac CT4; Cadillac CT5; Cadillac CTS; Chevrolet Camaro

Powertrain
- Engine: 1.4L Ecotec turbocharged DOHC I4 with eAssist
- Transmission: 6-speed automatic

Dimensions
- Wheelbase: 2,775 mm (109.3 in)
- Length: 4,396 mm (173.1 in)
- Width: 1,816 mm (71.5 in)
- Height: 1,390 mm (55 in)

The Chevrolet Code 130R is a compact 2-door sports coupe concept revealed by American automobile manufacturer Chevrolet at the 2012 North American International Auto Show inspired by the Chevrolet Nova.

== Overview ==
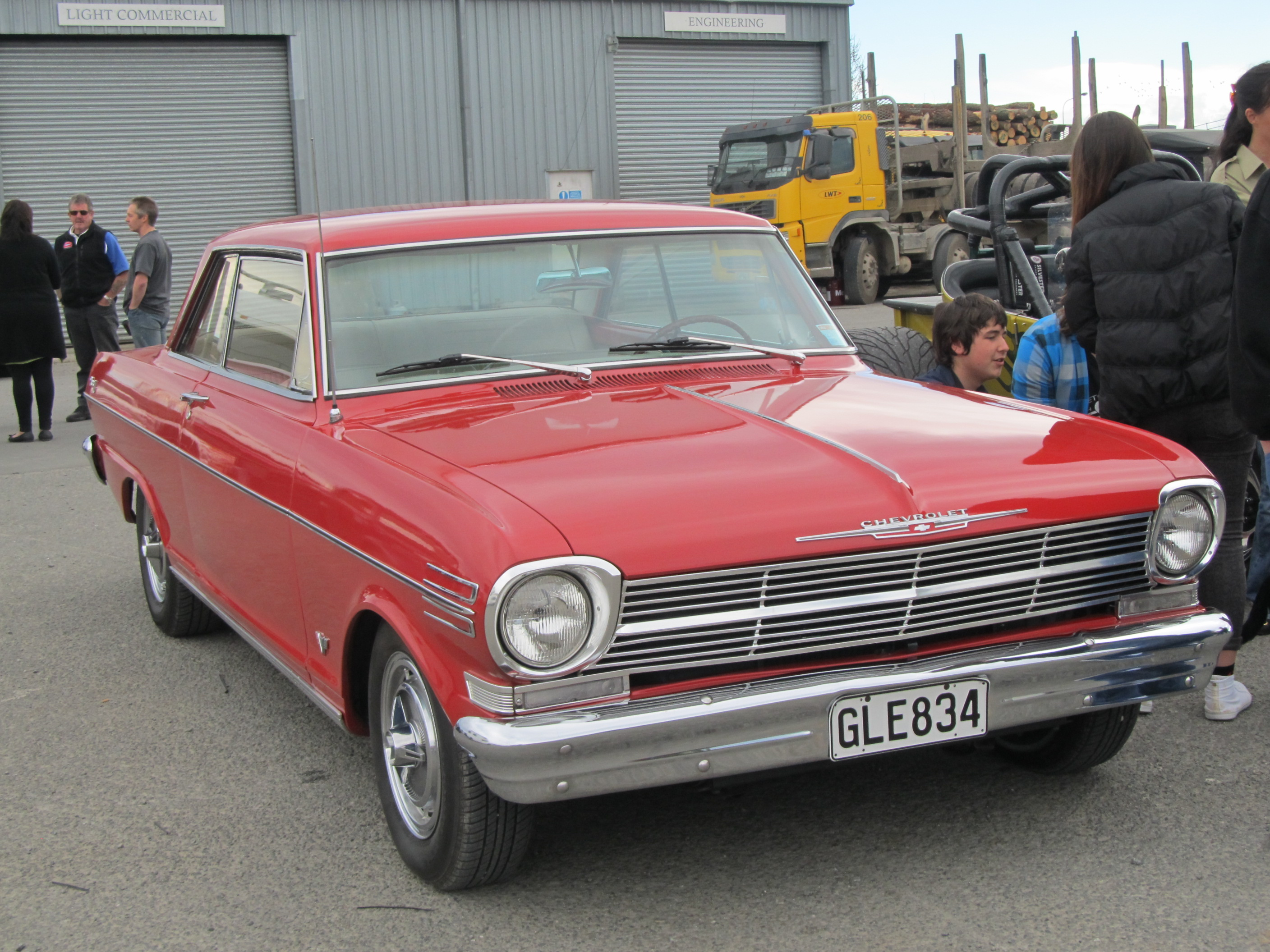
The Chevrolet Code 130R concept's design is inspired by the 1962 Chevrolet Nova.

The Chevrolet Code 130R concept was revealed at the North American International Auto Show (NAIAS) on January 9, 2012 in Detroit, Michigan, revealed alongside the Chevrolet Tru 140S concept. It is a compact 2-door, 4-seat sports coupe inspired by the 1962 Chevrolet Nova and is designed to be a US$20,000 car for younger buyers.

The Code 130R was designed by Joe Baker, designer of three Ford concepts; the 2003 427, 2004 Bronco, and 2007 Interceptor.

== Specifications ==
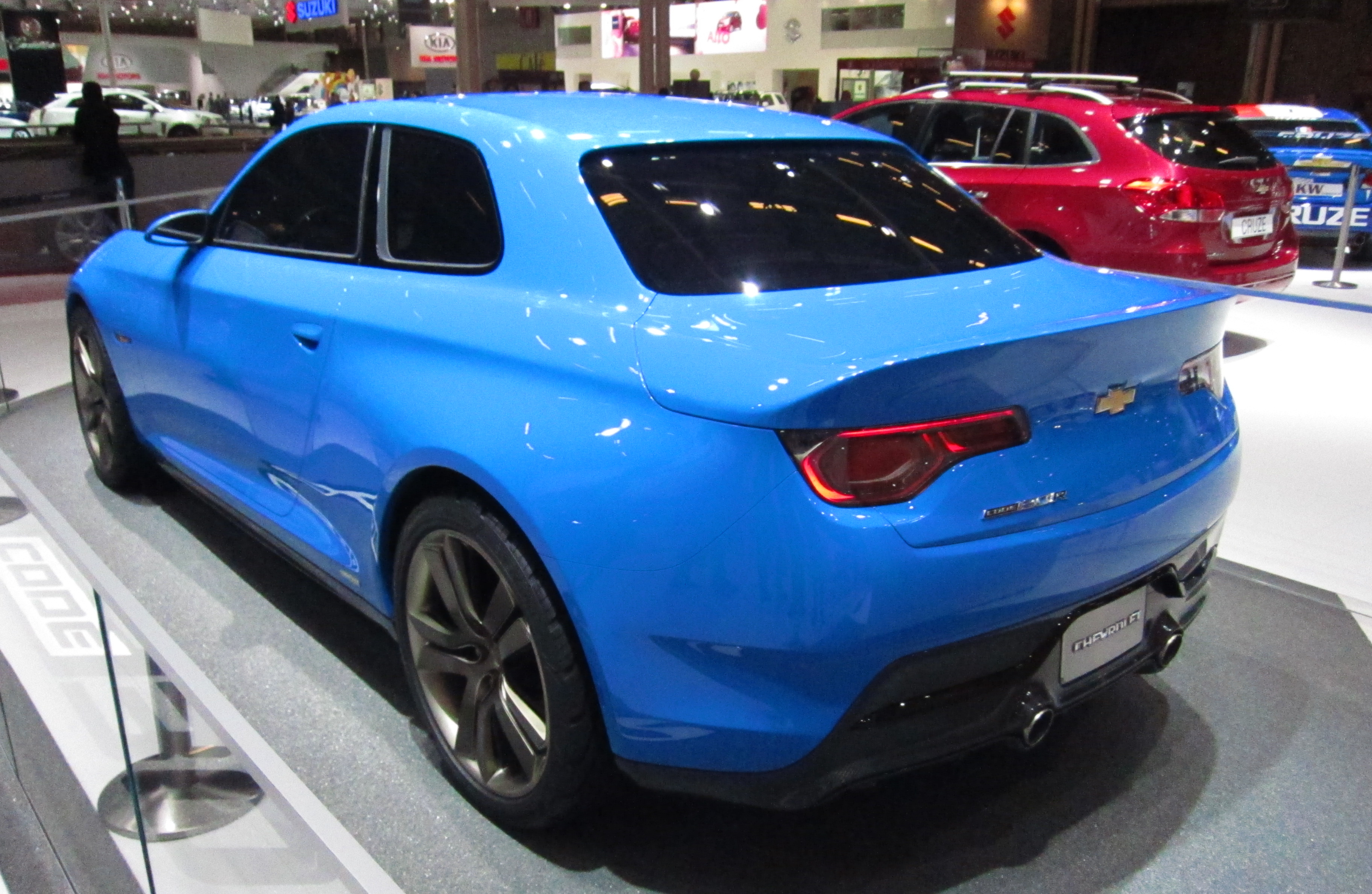
2012 Chevrolet Code 130R (rear) at the 2012 Paris Motor Show in Paris, France.

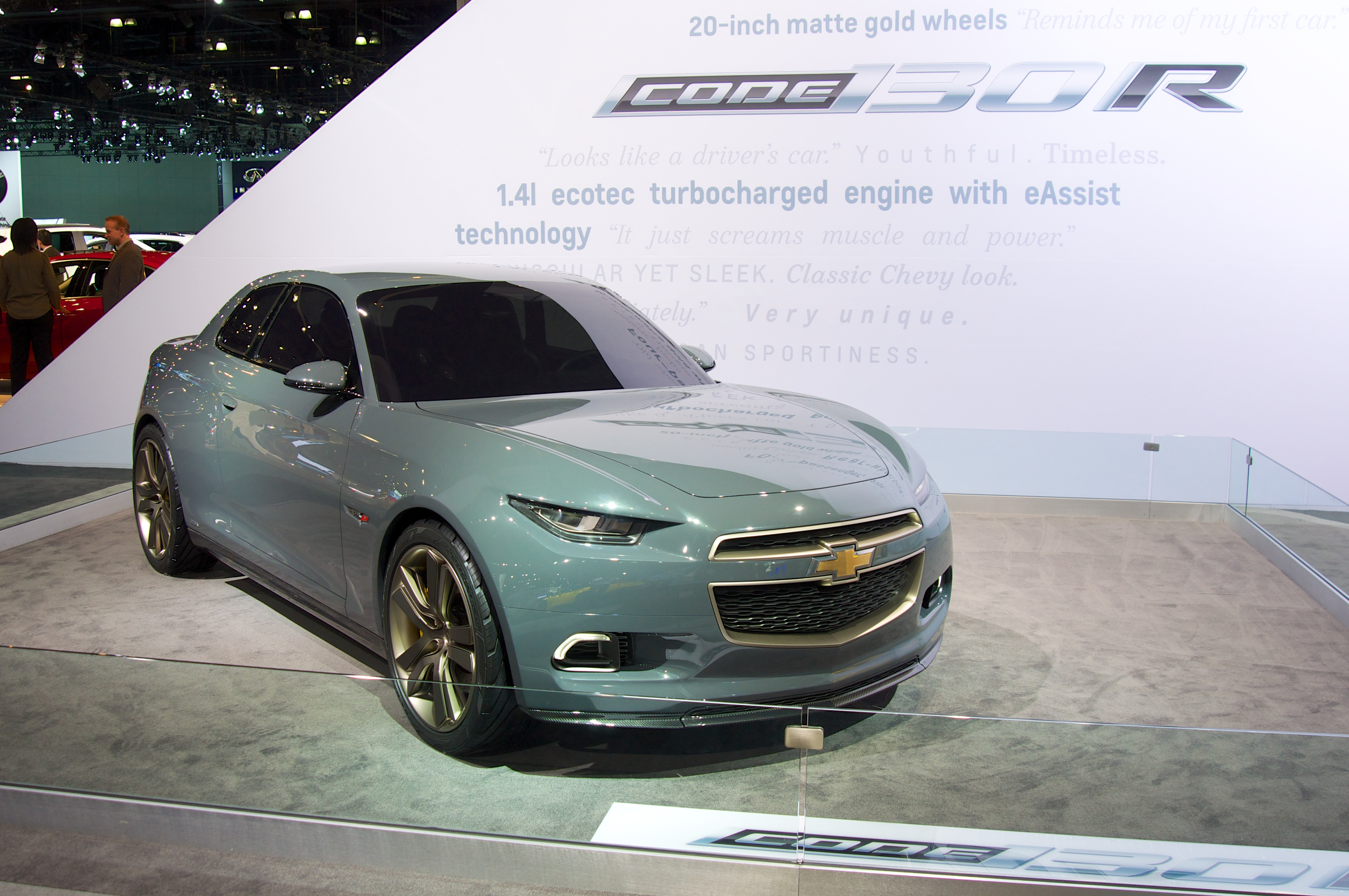
2012 Chevrolet Code 130R (front) at the 2012 LA Auto Show in Los Angeles, California, United States.

=== Technical specs ===
The Chevrolet Code 130R uses GM's 150-horsepower 1.4L Ecotec turbocharged DOHC I4 with eAssist technology and is in the front-engine, rear-wheel drive layout. It has a 6-speed automatic transmission and is built on the General Motors Alpha platform, which was also used by the 2013 Cadillac ATS, also shown at the 2012 NAIAS, and later on used by the 2014 CTS, 2020 CT4, and CT5 as well as the 2016 Chevrolet Camaro.

=== Exterior ===
Chevrolet built three Code 130R concepts—the original one painted in red shown at NAIAS, another painted in sky blue shown at the 2012 Paris Motor Show, and a third painted in slate gray at the 2012 LA Auto Show—all of which feature 20-inch matte anodized gold rims. The Code 130R concept features Chevrolet's cross flag badge on the fenders, which is used as the Corvette's badge, and other 'Code 130R' badges throughout the car.

== Production model ==
At the North American International Auto Show, Chevrolet held a poll, asking which compact coupe concept the showgoers prefer; the rear-wheel drive Code 130R or the front-wheel drive Tru 140S. The vast majority of votes were for the Code 130R, which—if built—would be a US$20,000 Chevrolet Nova successor. This car was never built, however. Although, the sixth-generation Chevrolet Camaro did carry over many design cues which were featured on the Code 130R concept, mainly in the side and rear profiles.

== See also ==
- Chevrolet Tru 140S, a concept revealed alongside the Code 130R
