= Chevrolet Nexia =

Chevrolet Nexia may refer to:

- Daewoo Cielo, sold in Uzbekistan from 1996 to 2016 as the Daewoo Nexia
- Chevrolet Aveo (T200), sold in Uzbekistan from 2016–present as the Ravon Nexia in Russia
