= Chevrolet Tru 140S =

Chevrolet concept vehicle

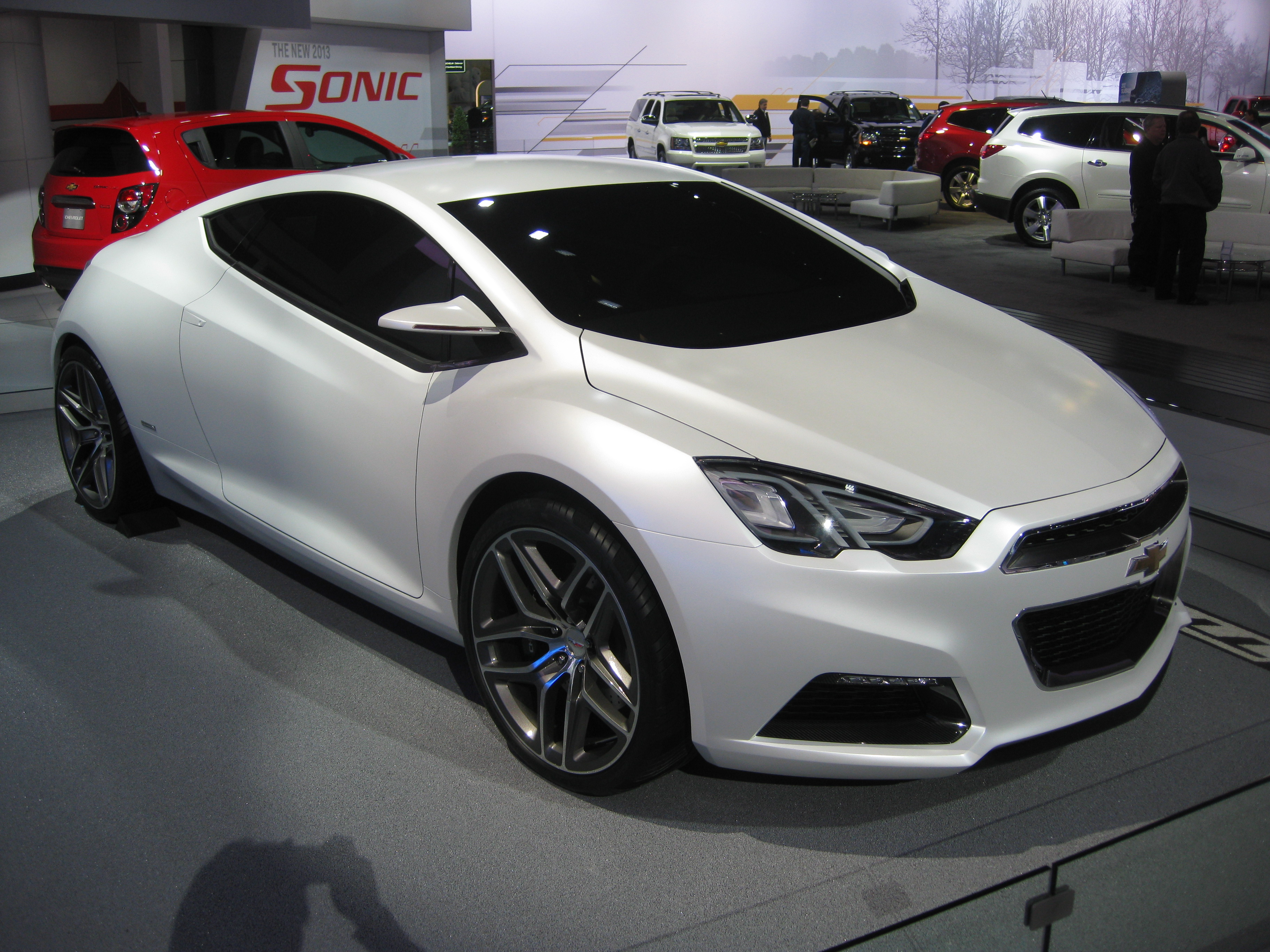
- 2012 Chevrolet Tru 140S at the North American International Auto Show (front)

Overview
- Manufacturer: Chevrolet
- Production: 2012 (2 produced)
- Designer: Nick David

Body and chassis
- Class: Sports car (S)
- Body style: 2-door coupe
- Layout: Front-engine, front-wheel drive (FF)
- Platform: GM Delta II
- Related: Chevrolet Cruze; Chevrolet Volt; Opel Astra J

Powertrain
- Engine: 1.4L Ecotec turbocharged DOHC I4 with eAssist
- Transmission: 6-speed automatic

Dimensions
- Wheelbase: 2,743 mm (108.0 in)
- Length: 4,396 mm (173.1 in)
- Width: 1,816 mm (71.5 in)
- Height: 1,390 mm (55 in)

The Chevrolet Tru 140S is a compact 2-door sports coupe concept revealed by American automobile manufacturer Chevrolet at the 2012 North American International Auto Show.

== Overview ==
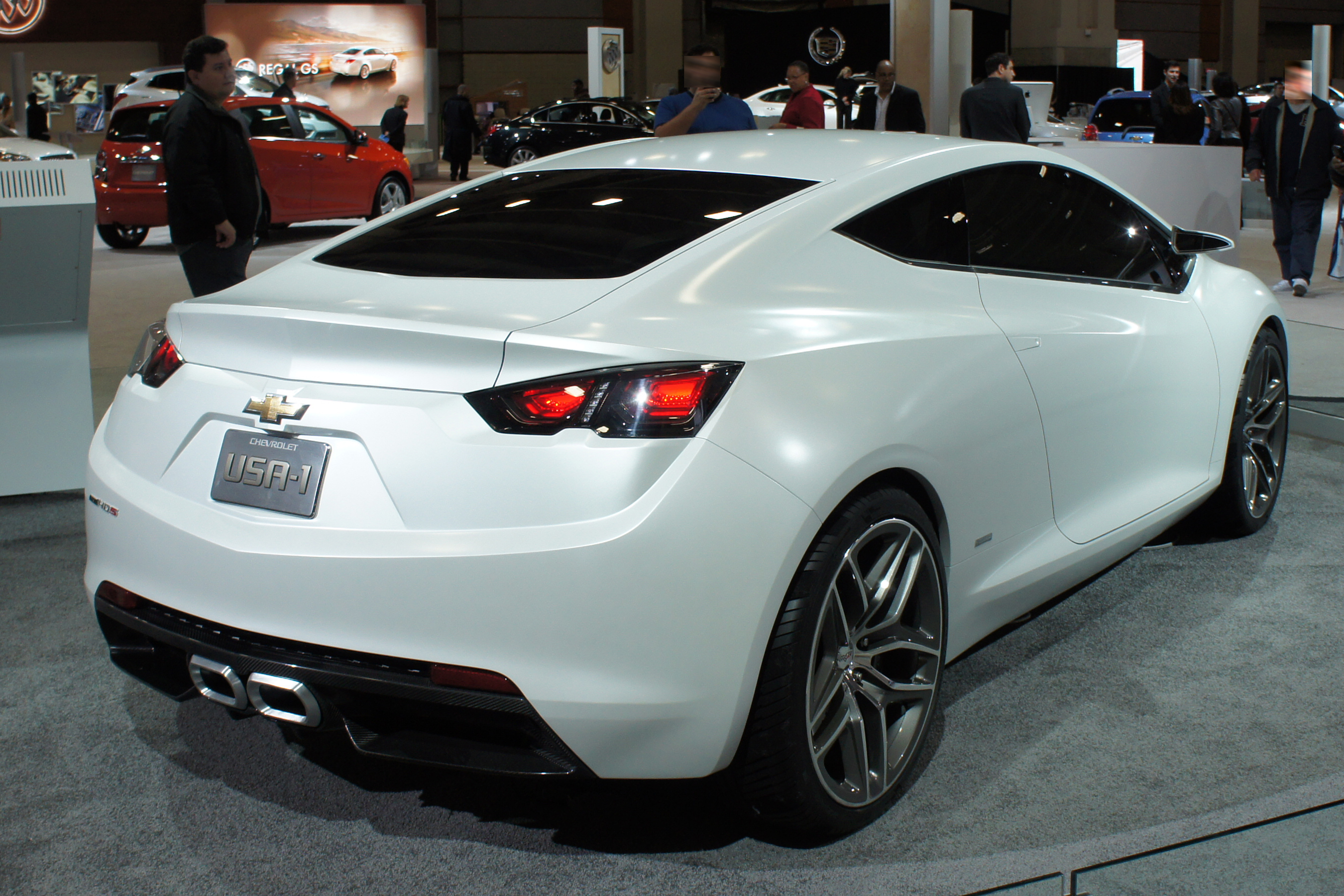
2012 Chevrolet Tru 140S (rear) at the 2012 Washington Auto Show in Washington, District of Columbia, United States.

The Chevrolet Tru 140S concept was revealed at the North American International Auto Show (NAIAS) on January 9, 2012, in Detroit, Michigan, revealed alongside the Chevrolet Code 130R concept. It is a compact 2-door, 4-seat sports coupe designed to be a US$20,000 sports car targeted towards younger buyers. The Tru 140S was designed by General Motors senior exterior designer Nick David.

== Specifications ==
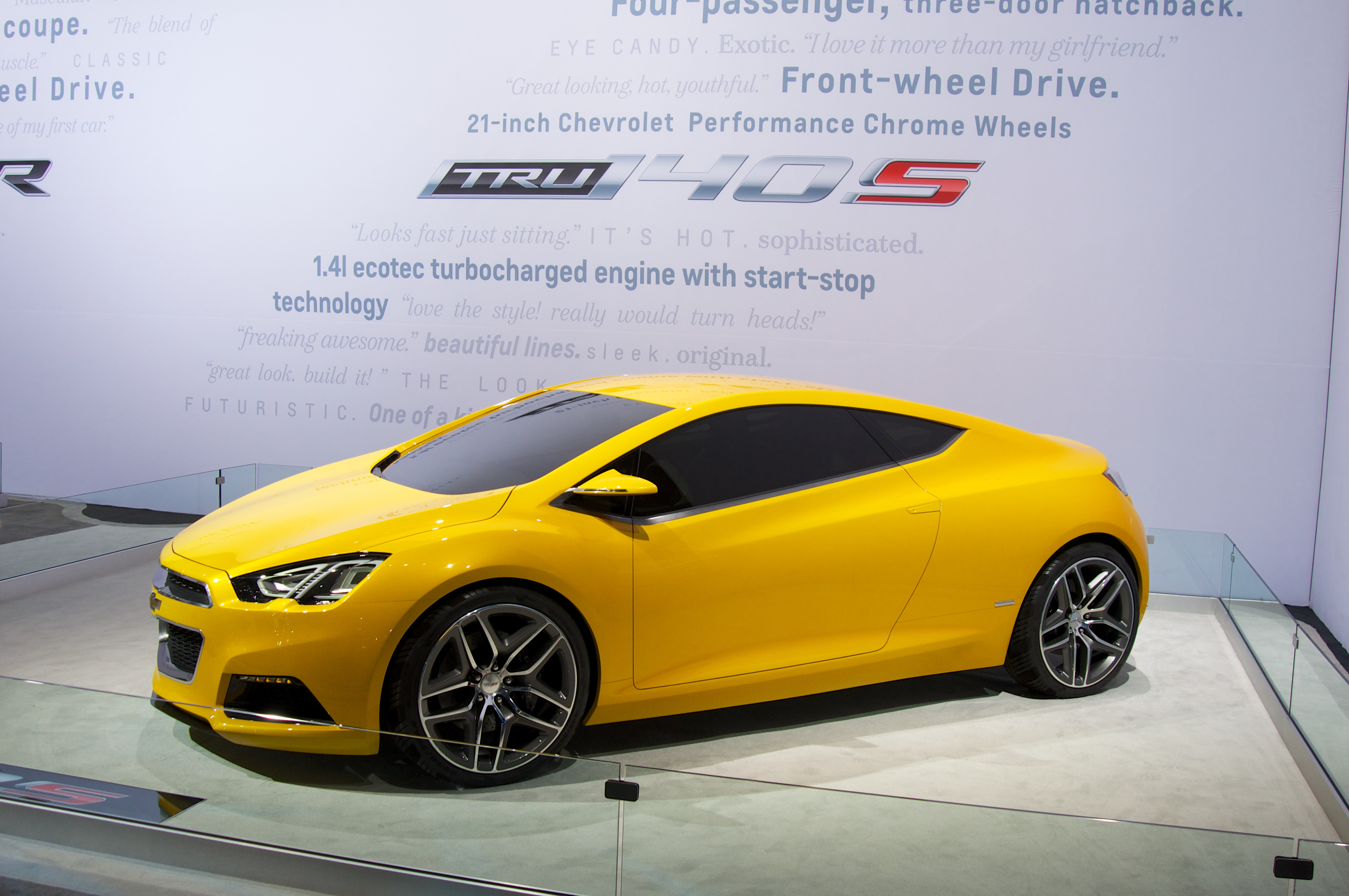
2012 Chevrolet Tru 140S at the 2012 LA Auto Show in Los Angeles, California, United States.

=== Technical specs ===
The Chevrolet Tru 140S uses GM's 150-horsepower 1.4L Ecotec turbocharged DOHC I4 with a start-stop system and is in the front-engine, front-wheel drive layout. It has a 6-speed automatic transmission and is built on the General Motors Delta II platform, which is also used by other GM compact cars such as the 2009 Chevrolet Cruze, 2009 Chevrolet Volt, and the 2010 Opel Astra.

=== Exterior ===
Chevrolet built two Tru 140S concepts—the original one painted in white shown at NAIAS and another painted in yellow revealed at the 2012 LA Auto Show—both featuring 21-inch chrome rims.

== Chevrolet Jolt EV ==
On May 4, 2016, a website for a fictional vehicle based on the Chevrolet Tru 140S concept called the "Chevrolet Jolt EV" was created, and it gained attention from multiple media outlets, such as The Verge, Road & Track, Motor Trend, and Forbes, as well as traffic from over 20,000 visitors that day. Matt Teske, owner of a 2016 Chevrolet Volt and a fan of electric vehicles and Chevrolet cars, created the website and stated on it "I figured if traditional auto manufacturers weren’t going to develop more compelling EV options to excite consumers, I would help."

== See also ==
- Chevrolet Code 130R, a concept revealed alongside the Tru 140S
