= Pan Asia Technical Automotive Center =

Pan Asia Technical Automotive Center Co. Ltd
- Trade name: PATAC
- Native name: 泛亚汽车技术中心有限公司
- Company type: Joint-venture
- Industry: Automotive
- Founded: Shanghai, China June 12, 1997
- Headquarters: Pudong, Shanghai, China
- Key people: Mark LaBaere (president); Liu Qiming (Executive vice president); Wu Donghai (Vice president); Frederique Klein (Vice president and CFO)
- Services: Localisation of global GM vehicles for China, new developments
- Owner: SAIC Motor (50%); General Motors (50%)
- Number of employees: 2000 (in 2011)
- Website: www.patac.com.cn

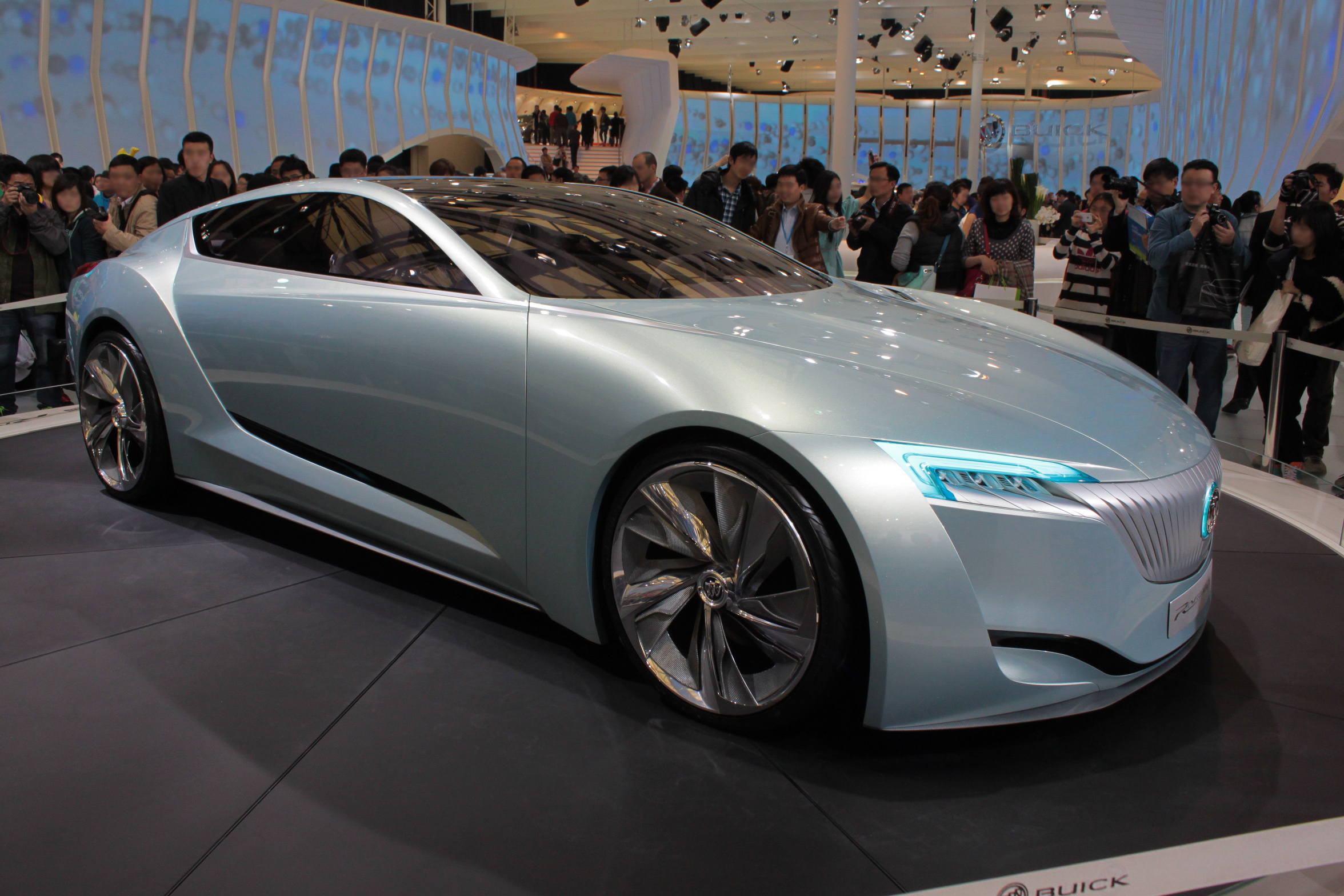
Buick Riviera Concept car developed by PATAC

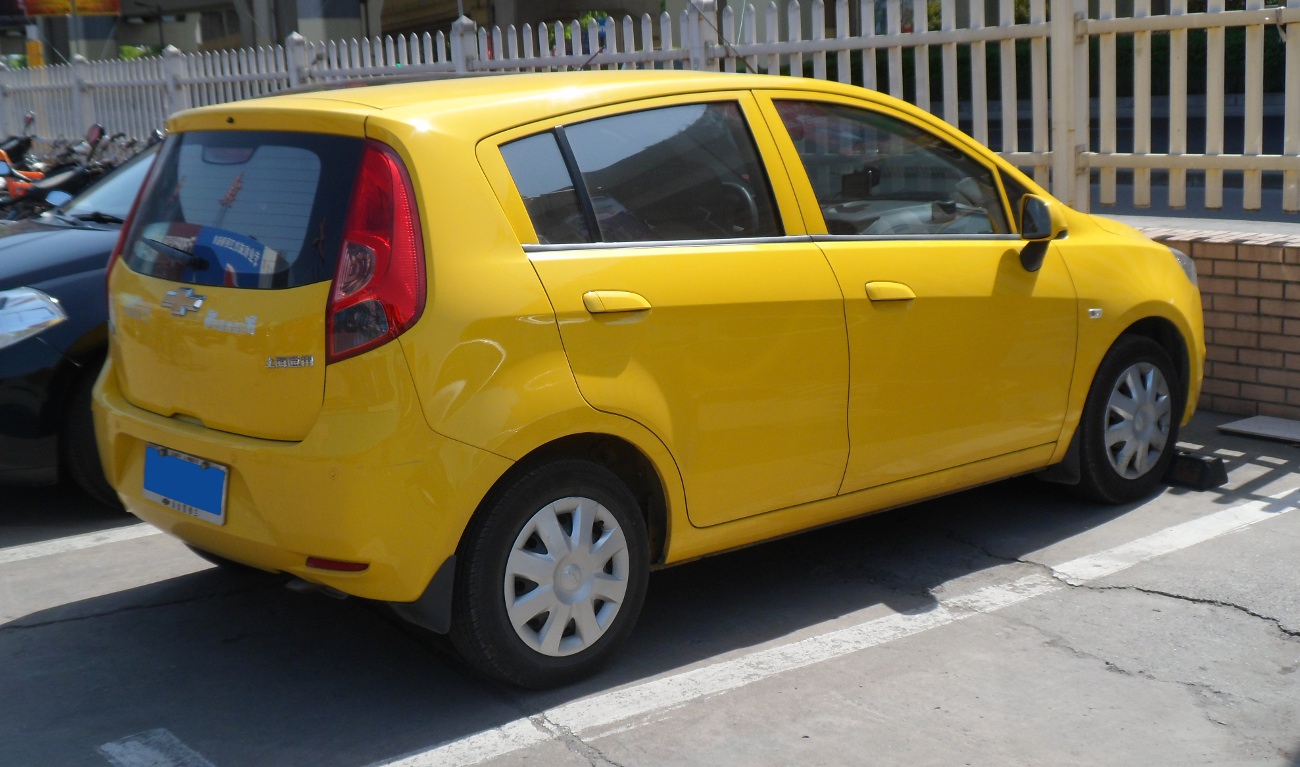
Chevrolet Sail developed by PATAC

The Pan Asia Technical Automotive Center (or PATAC) is a joint venture between General Motors and SAIC Motor. It is a design and engineering center in Pudong, Shanghai, China, and is involved in engineering for Shanghai GM products, but also functions as one out of six technical development and design centers of General Motors.

== Overview ==
PATAC has prepared several global GM vehicles for the Chinese market. From PATAC's own development come the Chevrolet Sail and the second generation Buick GL8. The facelifted Chevrolet Aveo (T200) sedan was also designed in collaboration with PATAC. The centre is also creating every two years a concept car, a total of seven until 2013. Among them two concepts of a new Buick Riviera, in 2007 and 2013.

PATAC disposes of various facilities for design and for motor vehicle development and evaluation, among them a climate wind tunnel, opened on March 27, 2012.

PATAC also manages together with Shanghai GM the 5.67-square-kilometer proving ground in Guangde County, Anhui (31.044266°N 119.425751°E) with 60 km test roads, opened on September 22, 2012.

The joint-venture PATAC is not to be confused with GM China's own GM China Advanced Technical Center (ATC), which is located in Shanghai next to the GM China headquarters.

== See also ==
- SAIC-GM

== Sources ==
- Official web site of PATAC (Adobe Flash)
- GM China web page showing GM joint-ventures in China
