= Daewoo Kalos =

American Subcompact car

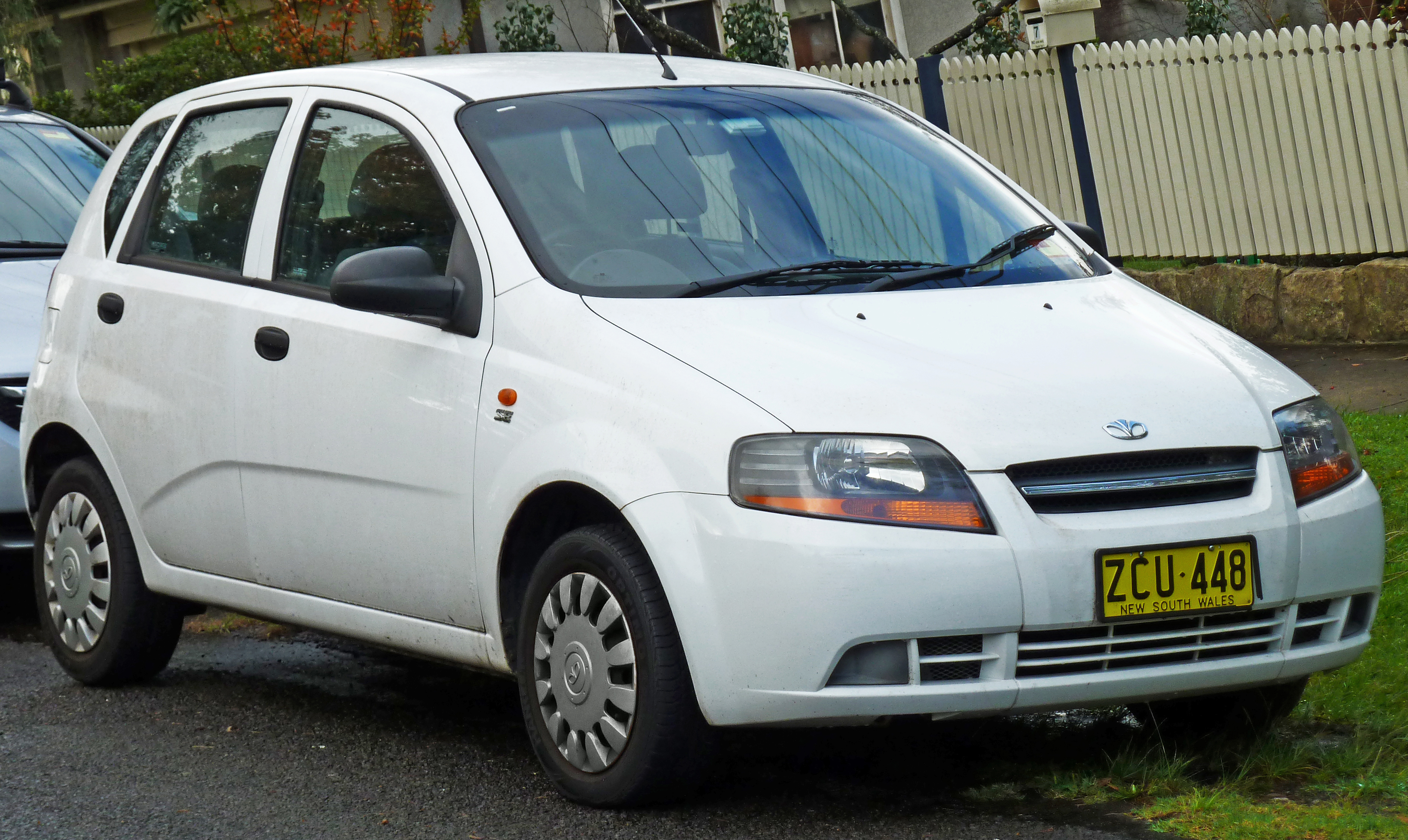
- 2003–2004 Daewoo Kalos 5-door hatchback

Overview
- Manufacturer: GM Daewoo
- Also called: Chevrolet Aveo; Chevrolet Kalos (T200/T250); Chevrolet Lova (T250); Chevrolet Nexia (T250); Daewoo Gentra (T250); Holden Barina (T200/T250); Pontiac G3 (United States and Canada); Pontiac G3 Wave (T250, United States and Canada); Pontiac Wave (T200, United States and Canada); Ravon Nexia (T250); Suzuki Swift+ (T200/T250; hatchback); ZAZ Vida (T250)
- Production: 2002–2011 (South Korea); 2002–2023 (under license)
- Model years: 2004–2011 (North America); 2009–2017 (Mexico)
- Assembly: South Korea: Bupyeong-gu; China: Yantai (Shanghai GM); Mexico: San Luis Potosí (San Luis Potosí Assembly); Colombia: Bogotá (GM Colombia, until November 2013); Ecuador: Quito (GM Ecuador); Venezuela: Valencia (GM Venezuela); Thailand: Rayong (GM Thailand); Vietnam: Hanoi (GM Vietnam); India: Halol (GM India); Russia: Kaliningrad (Avtotor); Uzbekistan: Asaka (GM Uzbekistan); Ukraine: Zaporizhzhia (ZAZ); Kazakhstan: Ust-Kamenogorsk; Azerbaijan: Hajigabul (AzerMash); Poland: Warsaw (FSO); Egypt: Cairo (GM Egypt)
- Designer: Giorgetto Giugiaro at Italdesign; James C. Shyr (2006; exterior)

Body and chassis
- Class: Subcompact car
- Body style: 3/5-door hatchback 4-door sedan
- Layout: Front-engine, front-wheel-drive
- Platform: T200 platform

Powertrain
- Engine: 1.2 L S-TEC I4 (petrol); 1.4 L E-TEC I4 (petrol); 1.5 L E-TEC I4 (petrol); 1.6 L E-TEC I4 (petrol); 1.6 L Family 1 I4 (petrol)
- Transmission: 4-speed Aisin 80-40LE automatic 5-speed manual

Dimensions
- Wheelbase: 2,480 mm (97.6 in) (2002–07 hatchback, sedan); 2,480 mm (97.6 in) (2007–11 hatchback); 2,489 mm (98.0 in) (2007–11 sedan)
- Length: 3,880 mm (152.8 in) (2002–07 hatchback); 4,235 mm (166.7 in) (2002–07 sedan); 3,920 mm (154.3 in) (2007–11 hatchback); 4,318 mm (170.0 in) (2007–11 sedan); 4,315 mm (169.9 in) (2012–present sedan)
- Width: 1,670 mm (65.7 in) (2002–07 hatchback, sedan); 1,680 mm (66.1 in) (2007–11 hatchback); 1,710 mm (67.3 in) (2007–11 sedan); 1,709 mm (67.3 in) (2012–present sedan)
- Height: 1,485 mm (58.5 in) (2002–07 hatchback, sedan); 1,505 mm (59.3 in) (2007–11 hatchback, sedan)
- Curb weight: 970–1,150 kg (2,140–2,540 lb)

Chronology
- Predecessor: Daewoo Lanos
- Successor: Chevrolet Aveo (T300); Chevrolet Sail (Mexico, called Chevrolet Aveo)

The Daewoo Kalos (/əˈveɪ.oʊ/ ə-VAY-oh) is a subcompact automobile initially launched in 2002. The Kalos was developed by the initially-independent South Korean manufacturer Daewoo, later GM Korea. Originally marketed as the Daewoo Kalos across most of the world, it was later marketed as the Chevrolet Aveo (as well as by numerous other names). The car thus became the first generation of the Chevrolet Aveo nameplate from the Chevrolet division of the American manufacturer General Motors. The model received the T200 internal codes during the car's development. The T250 code was designated for the model's major facelift.

Designed, engineered and originally marketed by GM Daewoo, the Kalos/Aveo superseded the Daewoo Lanos and was marketed worldwide in 120 countries under seven brands (Chevrolet, Daewoo, Holden, Pontiac, Ravon, Suzuki and ZAZ).

Production ended in 2023.

== Nameplate ==
In its home market of South Korea, the T200 was marketed as Daewoo Kalos, before being rebranded Daewoo Gentra. The nameplate Kalos derives from the Greek word καλός (kalós) for "beautiful" and "good".

In several Asian, Australasian, and European export markets, the "Daewoo Kalos" name was also used, only to be later renamed "Chevrolet Aveo", or Holden Barina in the case of Australia. In Indonesia this generation was sold under three nameplates, "Chevrolet Aveo" for the hatchback, Chevrolet Kalos for the sedan, and for the sedan for taxi fleet as the "Chevrolet Lova".

Other names used include ZAZ Vida in Ukraine, Ravon Nexia in Russia, Chevrolet Nexia in Uzbekistan and Azerbaijan, Chevrolet Lova in China and Pontiac G3 in the United States, selling alongside the "Chevrolet Aveo" version. In Canada, the name Pontiac Wave was originally used, followed by Pontiac G3 Wave, before adopting the "Pontiac G3" name used in the United States. Since 2003, Suzuki also sold a version in Canada as the Suzuki Swift+ alongside the Chevrolet and Pontiac badged versions. The T200's successor, the T300 was released in 2011. The Swift+ was dropped after the 2011 model year due to poor sales along with the entire Suzuki brand, although Suzuki Canada lists 2010 as the final model year Swift+. In addition, the release of the Pontiac Wave5 is also very relevant to determine the difference of production years and production model names.

== T200 ==
The Daewoo Kalos was introduced in 2002, based on a then-new Daewoo platform named T200, replacing the Daewoo Lanos (T100). Under development before Daewoo's bankruptcy, the Kalos was the company's first new model introduction following its subsequent takeover by General Motors. Manufacture of the Kalos began in early March 2002, with pre-production prototypes shown at the Geneva Motor Show in April 2002.

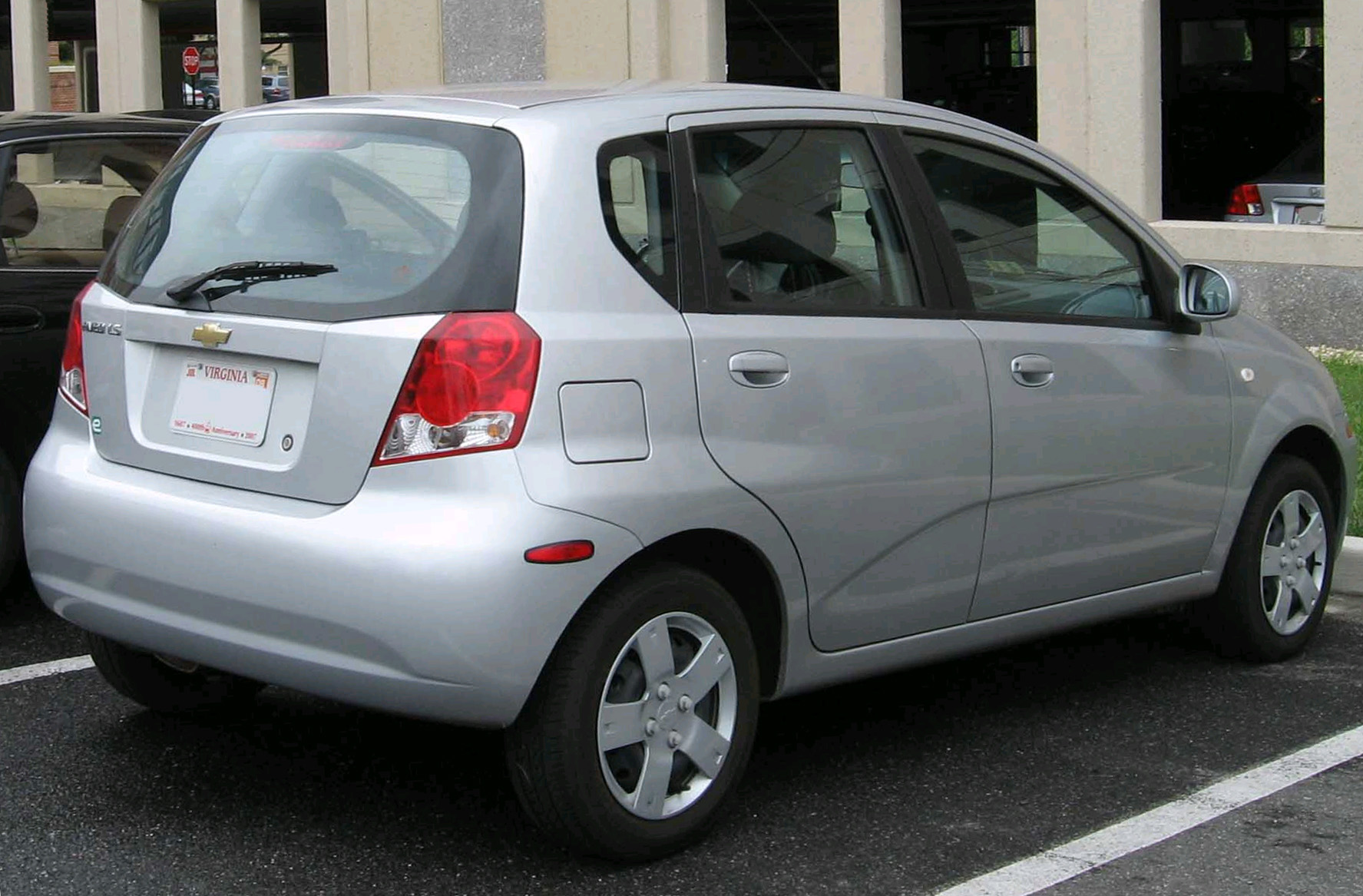
Chevrolet Aveo hatchback (T200, US and Canada)

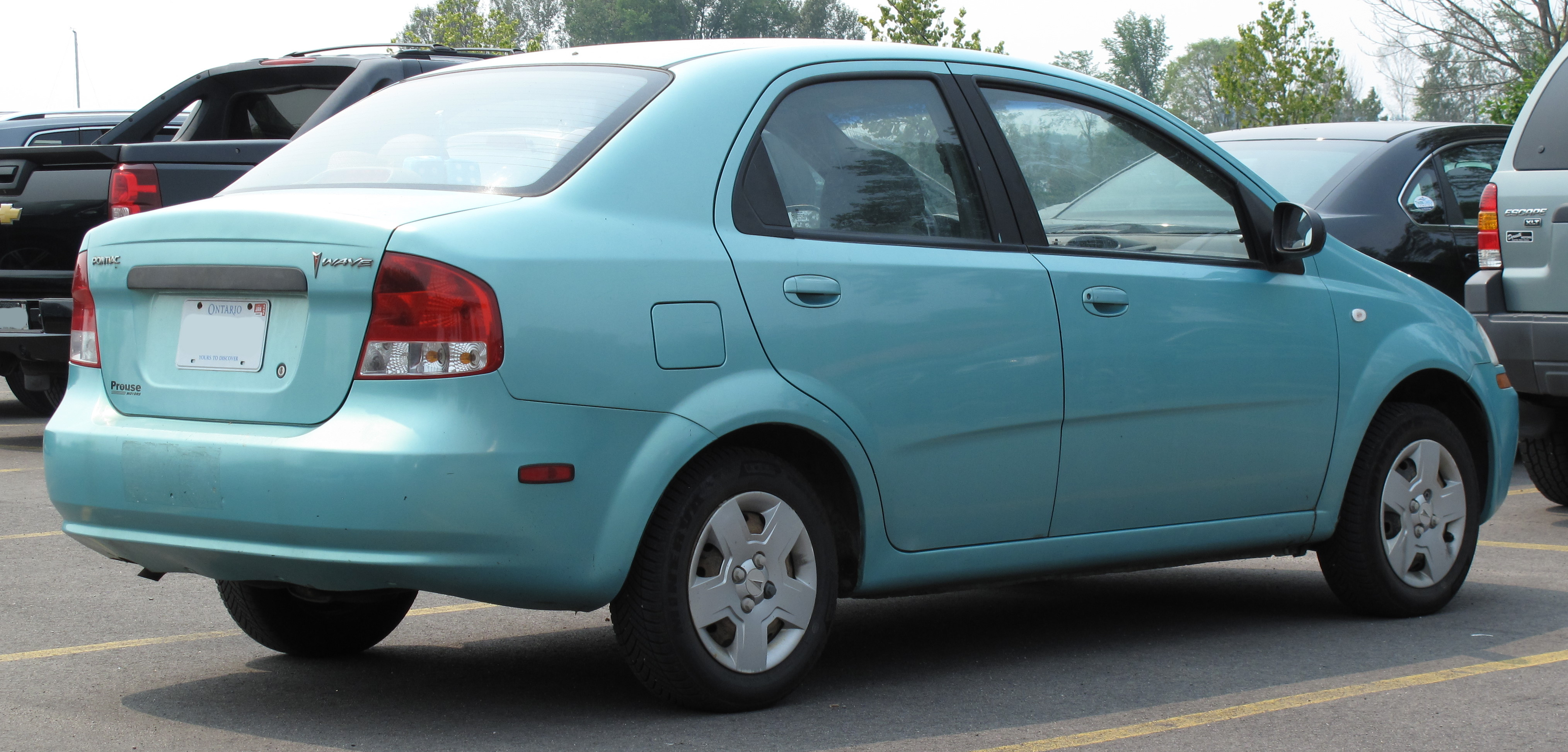
Pontiac Wave sedan (T200, US and Canada)

Designed by Italdesign, the Kalos derives directly from the Kalos Dream concept vehicle first presented at the 2000 Paris Motor Show and subsequent developmental concepts at the 2001 Frankfurt Motor Show, 2002 Geneva Motor Show, and 2003 Geneva Motor Show. During this three-year development period Daewoo was struggling financially, with the ultimate fate of the company and the concept vehicle remaining uncertain.

Two different T200 front-end styling designs were sold. When released in 2002, the T200 headlamps were detached from the horizontal amber turn signal strip, located directly below. This detached style, used primarily in South Korea and North America, was used in conjunction with a semi-elliptical grille. When sales in Europe began in 2003, the headlights were an integrated unit that slanted upwards from the "V-shaped" grille towards the front fenders. In Australia, when the Daewoo Kalos was introduced in 2003, the hatchback featured the integrated lighting arrangement, with the detached style used to differentiate the sedans. In South Korea, where the detached lights were used at first, the integrated design was later utilized as a facelift.

The T200 sedan and five-door hatchback (Chevrolet Aveo5 in the US and Canada) featured a swage line running along the lower body to the rear door, which kinks downward prominently on the five-door. Five-doors also feature a side window in the C/D pillar with a distinctively angled lower edge. Interiors feature a circular motif throughout. Upon introduction the initial European models carried an emblem reading "Design Giugiaro." Referring to his firm's design of the Kalos, Giorgetto Giugiaro said: "When we designed it, we set out to produce an alternative to conventional lines and tread new paths in terms of design."

The Kalos was sold in three available body styles: a 4-door sedan and 5-door hatchback from the beginning of production in 2002, and a 3-door hatchback available in certain European markets beginning in 2005. All body styles meet North American subcompact and European supermini or B-segment size classifications. The interior volume was 102.7 cu ft (2,910 L) (5-door) and 107.4 cu ft (3,040 L) (sedan) according to the EPA, meeting the minimum criterion for a compact vehicle despite being marketed as a sub-compact. Headroom was unmatched in its class at the time of its introduction. Per the German Verband der Automobilindustrie (VDA) standard, 5-door hatchbacks featured 175 litres (6.2 cu ft) of cargo space with the rear seats in their upright positions and 735 litres (26.0 cu ft) with the rear seats folded down, with a maximum payload rating of 495 kg (1,091 lb). Per U.S. Environmental Protection Agency (EPA) ratings, the 5-door hatchbacks featured cargo volume of 11.7 cubic feet (330 L) (rear seats up) to 42 cu ft (1,200 L) (rear seats down), with 7.1 cu ft (200 L) available in the sedan.

=== Design development ===
Daewoo's now disbanded Worthing Technical Centre in the UK conducted the initial research and platform engineering, with Daewoo's main Technical Center in Bupyong, Incheon, South Korea completing the majority of the later development programme. Daewoo engineers refined the chassis in Britain, on the proving ground at Motor Industry Research Association near Nuneaton, UK. Long-term testing covered nearly 2.2 million kilometers (1.4 million miles) with further testing outside South Korea on test sites in Arjeplog, Sweden; Granada and El Vendrell, Spain; Kapuskasing, Canada and Beijing, China. According to an April, 2003 GMDAT press release, Daewoo built 119 prototypes during the Kalos's design and development, crashing 31 for research and data-gathering purposes, and manufacturing 39 pilot production vehicles to verify standards and quality.

The body's sheet metal panel gaps were kept to 3 mm (0.12 in) and all but the roof panel were galvanized steel. 46% of the Kalos' underlying structural components were produced with high-strength steel, with tailor-welded blanks used in the production of the vehicle to put strength where needed while saving weight. The front suspension used MacPherson struts with offset coil springs and a stabilizer bar, while the rear featured a semi-independent torsion beam axle.

The body featured a drag coefficient of 0.35, with a frontal area of 2.16 m^{2} (23.3 sq ft) giving aerodynamic resistance of 0.74 m^{2} (8.0 sq ft). All Kalos iterations featured high H-point seating within a relatively narrow, short and high-roofed body that combined a long wheelbase with short front (81 cm or 32 in) and rear (49 cm or 19 in, hatchback) overhangs to maximize the outward visibility, interior space and maneuverability for the vehicle's footprint. Rear seat H-points are higher in all body types, giving the car theatre seating.

=== Design features ===
- The interior features Isofix child seat anchorages.
- The T200 (Aveo) features a slot specifically for holding toll tickets in the instrument panel adjacent to the steering wheel.
- The optional four-speed Aisin automatic has a “hold” feature that causes the four-speed automatic to behave like a three-speed manual: that is, it 'holds' the transmission in the gear which is selected. Useful for engine braking down long grades.
- Kalos models and their variants are marketed as entry-level vehicles in various trim levels globally with options unusual at entry-level: including AM/FM/CD/MP3 audio, steering wheel mounted radio controls, power locks and windows, remote keyless entry, and heated sideview mirrors and power sunroof.
- Common equipment includes tilt steering column, six-way adjustable driver seat, rear-window defroster, remote fuel door and a 60/40 split-bench folding rear seat. The instrument panel includes a tachometer, speedometer, odometer, trip odometer, fuel gauge, coolant temperature gauge and lighting dimmer control. The IP also has a center storage tray, lighter, extra 12-volt outlet, digital quartz clock and lighted glove box.

=== Safety ===
The Aveo has generally not been rated highly by consumer agencies and automotive reviewers. The Insurance Institute for Highway Safety reported in 2011 that "The Aveo does poorly in IIHS crash tests and receives the second lowest score of Marginal in roof strength, side impact and rear crash tests. It receives a higher score of Acceptable in front offset tests."

The Kalos models have been tested in at least four international New Car Assessment Programs, the results reflecting varying equipment and the differences in the tests themselves. Based on market priorities and price point control, some safety equipment is either unavailable or available only as extra-cost options (including side airbags, ABS, foglights and a rear center position three-point seatbelts and headrests.)

South Korea: models received four stars for both driver and front-seat passenger in crash tests conducted by the Korean Automobile Test and Research Institute (KATRI).

Europe: models received the following European New Car Assessment Program (Euro NCAP) ratings:

- Adult Occupant:, score 17
- Child Occupant:, score 26
- Pedestrian:, score 11

Australia: Holden Barina models received scored 2 stars (of 5) from Australasian New Car Assessment Program (ANCAP), a rating that is lower than the previous European-built, Opel-based Barina had scored, and the lowest ANCAP rating since 2004. Notably, the Australian Barina models do not feature the front-seat mounted side airbags offered in other markets (e.g., USA), nor are the ANCAP ratings directly comparable to the ratings of other NCAP programs.

ANCAP test results* Daewoo Kalos (2003)
| Test | Score |
|---|---|
| Overall | 3 /5 stars |
| Frontal offset | 5.90/16 |
| Side impact | 11.73/16 |
| Pole | Not Assessed |
| Seat belt reminders | 0/3 |
| Whiplash protection | Not Assessed |
| Pedestrian protection | Poor |
| Electronic stability control | Not Assessed |

== T250 ==
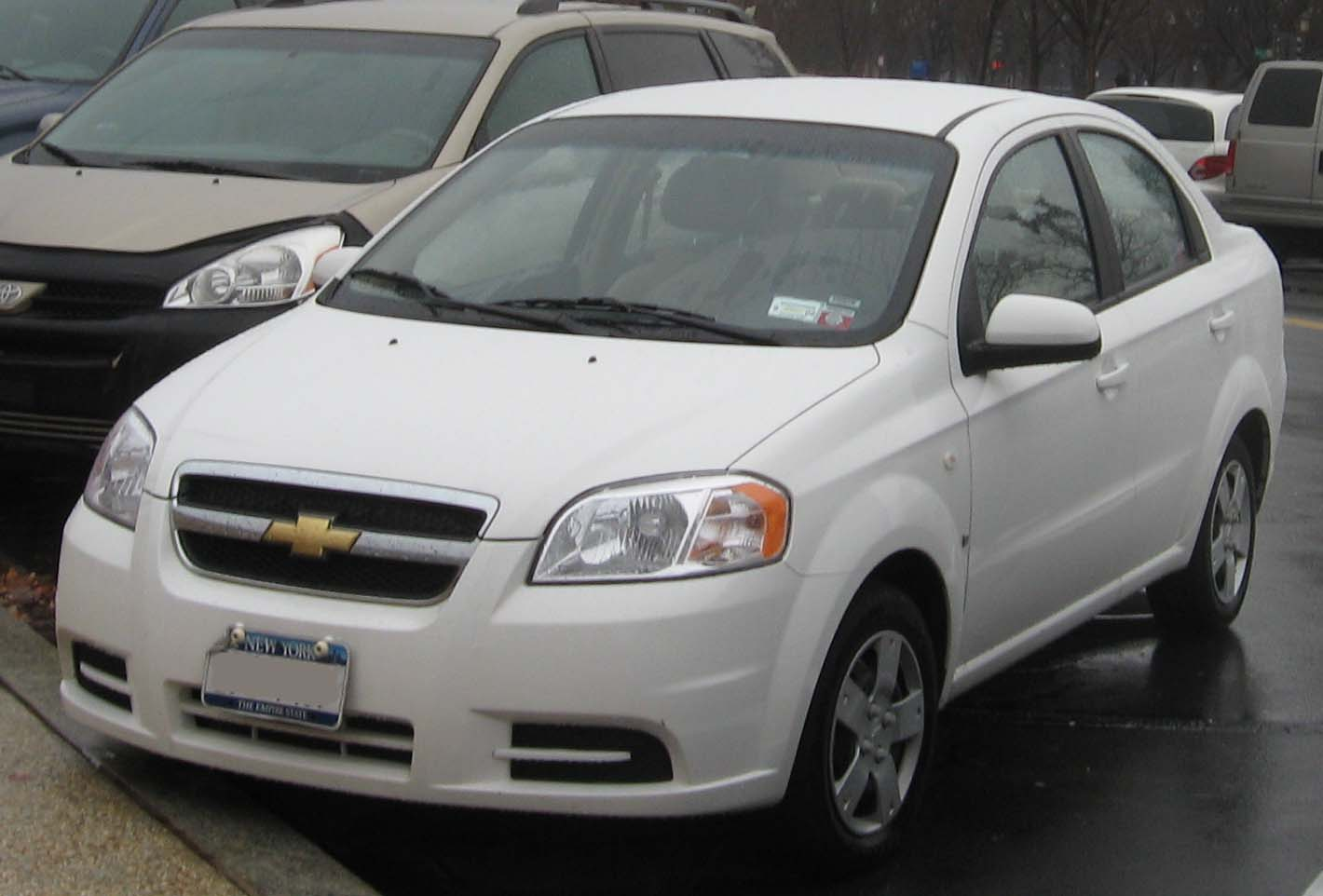
Chevrolet Aveo sedan (T250, US and Canada)

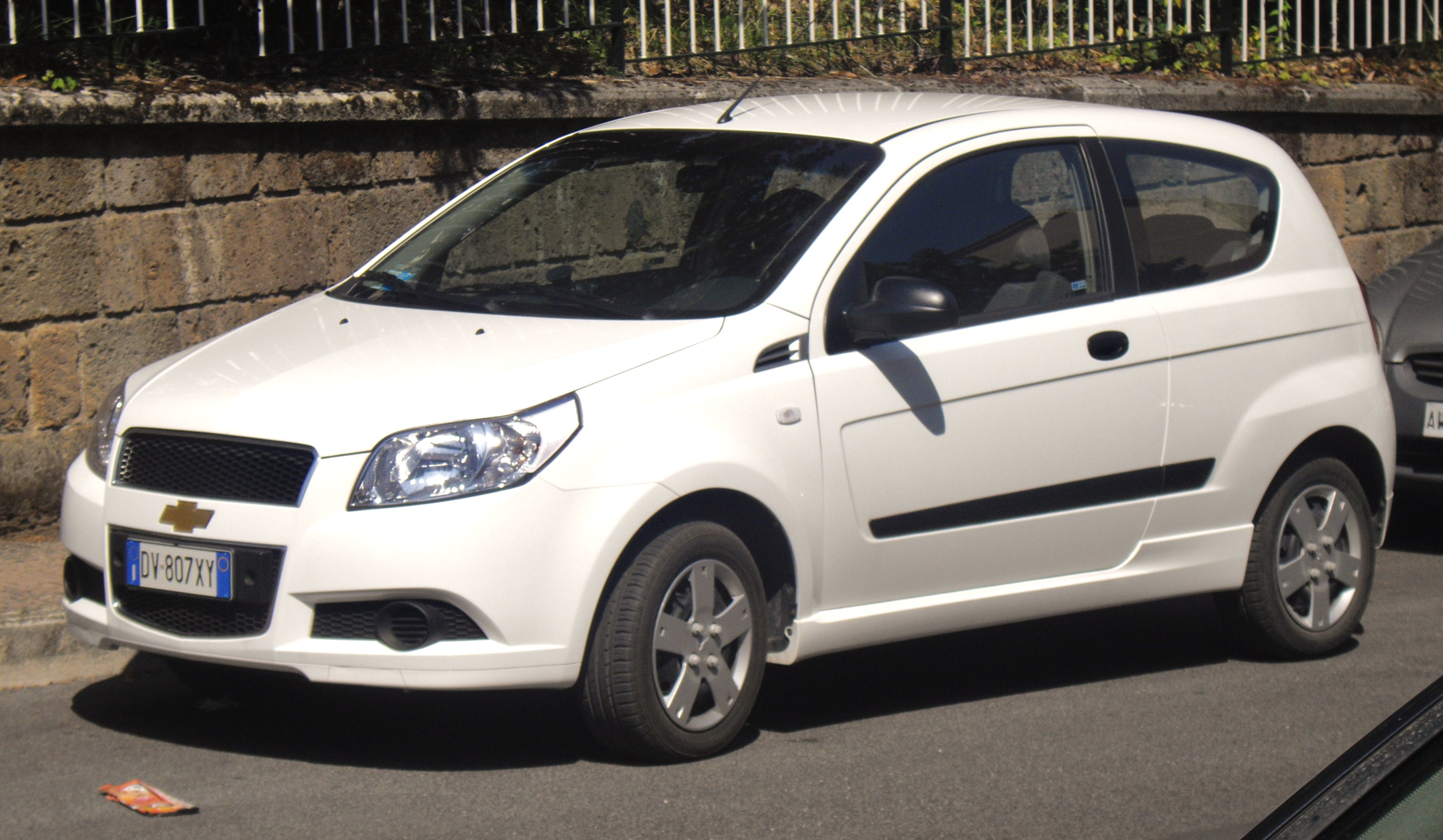
Chevrolet Aveo three-door (T250, Italy)

A revised sedan was introduced in April 2005 at the Shanghai Motor Show, designed in cooperation with the Pan Asia Technical Automotive Center (PATAC). Bearing the internal code T250 and sold in South Korea as the "Daewoo Gentra", the revision comprised primarily interior and exterior styling changes, a new interior instrument panel and minor equipment changes, including increased sound deadening. Incorporation of the radio antenna into the rear glass and extensive wind tunnel testing helped reduce the coefficient of drag from 0.348 to 0.326. It was subsequently launched in Europe in September 2005 at the Frankfurt Motor Show.

A restyled hatchback with the sedan's updated instrument panel was presented as the Chevrolet Aveo during the 2007 Frankfurt Motor Show, to be marketed in Europe and North America. The Korean market's restyle of the hatchback, the Gentra X, featured a less distinct/more "normal" grille treatment that formed the basis for the Holden, Pontiac and Suzuki-branded variants.

Later iterations, including the Kalos, Aveo, Barina and Gentra sedans, the Gentra X hatchback and the 2007 "Frankfurt Show" hatchbacks were styled in-house and with the assistance of PATAC, and depart notably from the original Giugiaro exterior and interior styling designs.

With launch of the Gentra X in South Korea, GMDAT had replaced engines of T250. 1.2 L S-TEC II inline-four engine was updated with features such as dual overhead camshaft (DOHC) and timing chain (older version has timing belt) system. 1.6 L E-TEC II engine had replaced with ECOTEC (GEN-III) engine with new features such as variable valve timing mechanism.

=== Safety ===
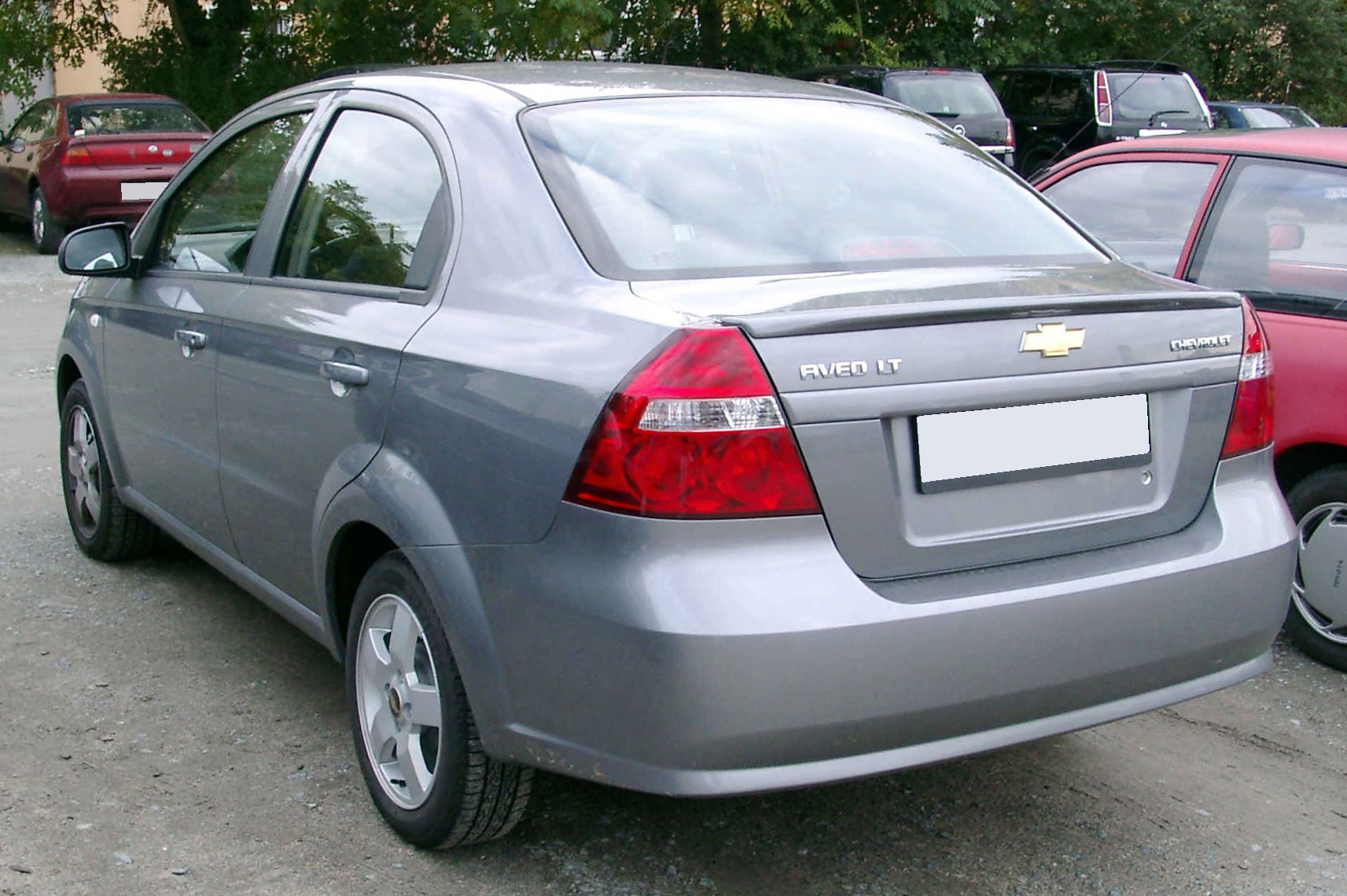
Chevrolet Aveo sedan (T250, Germany)

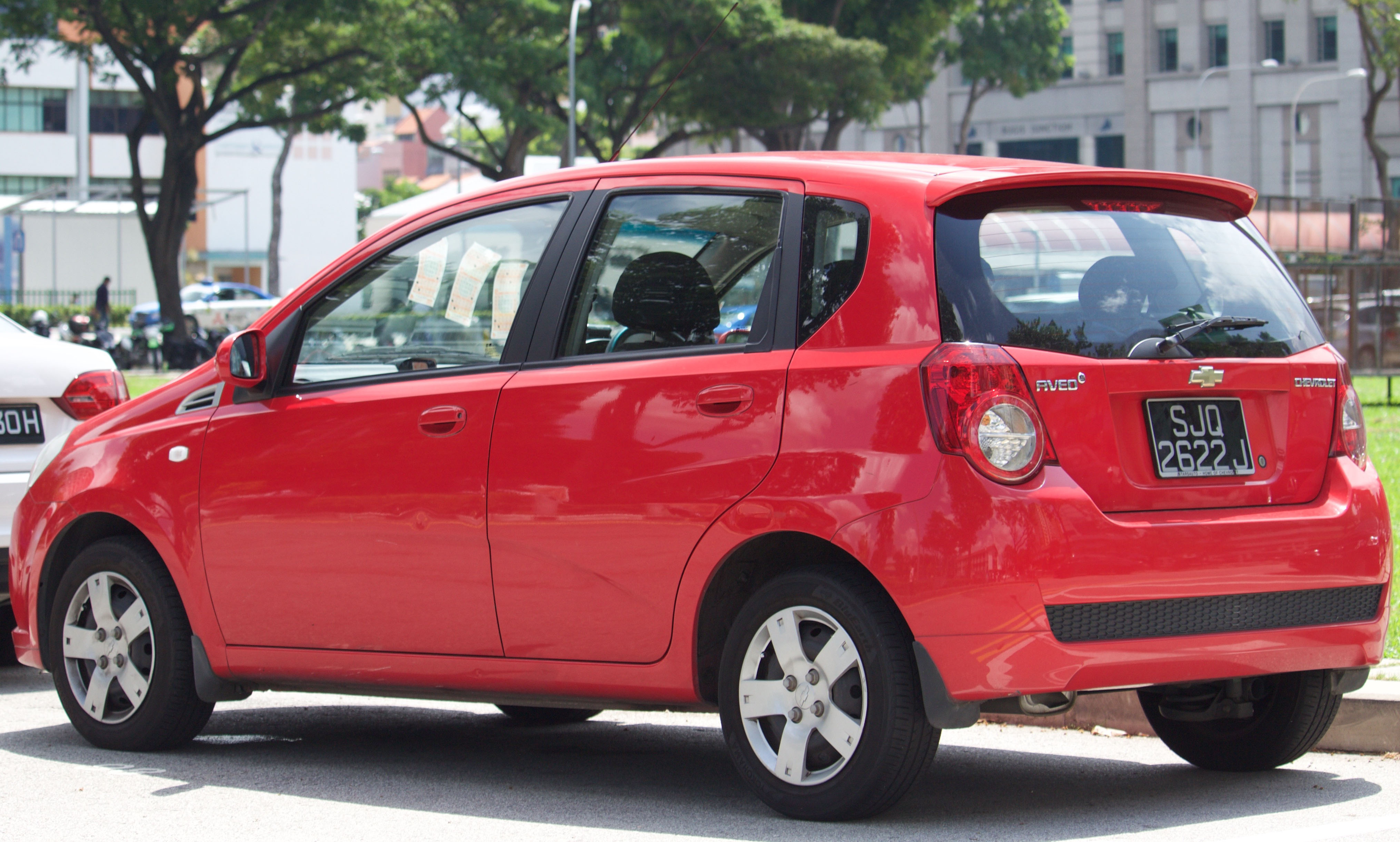
Chevrolet Aveo 1.4 hatchback (T250, Singapore)

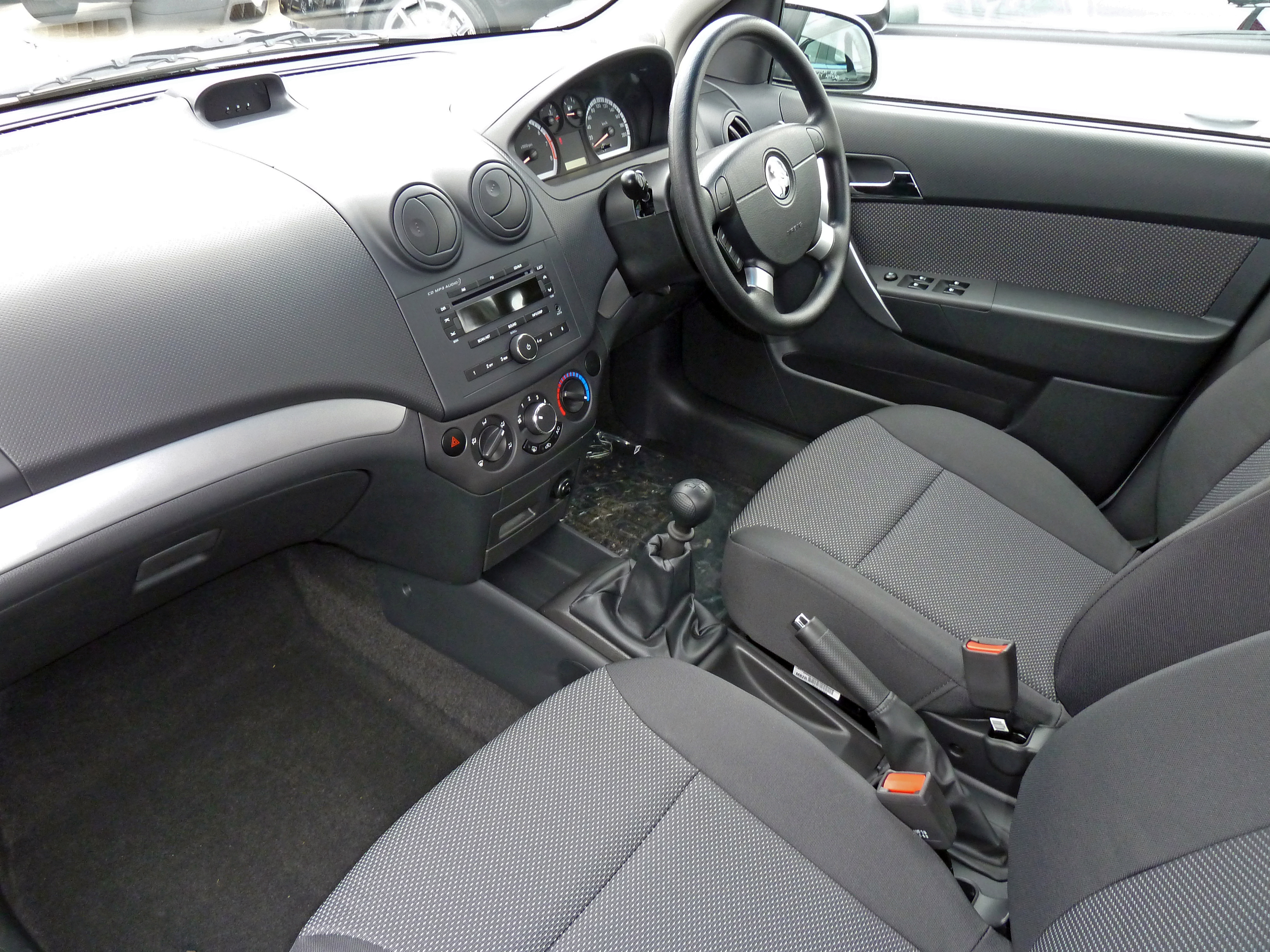
Holden Barina interior (Australia)

US-only Aveo safety features include available four-channel, four-sensor ABS system with electronic brake force distribution (EBD), and front (dual-stage) and side air bags for front row occupants with a passenger-sensing system. Beginning with 2008, Aveo standard equipment includes a tire pressure monitoring system. These features were offered in other markets like Canada, presumably because they were not perceived as being useful.

The T250 model has been tested by the European New Car Assessment Program (Euro NCAP):

- Adult Occupant: – 21 calculated as 3 for front plus 15 for side, with a struck out star: "The driver's chest made contact with the steering-wheel, distorting the rim. Compression of the driver's chest indicated an unacceptably high risk of life-threatening injury. As a result, the final star of the adult occupant rating is struck through."
- Child Occupant:, score 39
- Pedestrian:, score 19

These ratings apply only to 4-door sedan Aveo. The 5-door/3-door hatchback model has not been tested by EuroNCAP but since it has the same floor as T200 model it earns 3 stars without side airbags and 4 stars with side airbags. The Australian version of the T250 three-door, the Holden Barina, was crashtested by ANCAP and gained a four-star rating.

The American Insurance Institute for Highway Safety (IIHS) gave the Aveo an Acceptable overall rating in the frontal offset crash test and overall Marginal rating in the side impact crash test.

The National Highway Traffic Safety Administration's (www.safercar.gov) ratings (5dr):

- Passenger:
- Driver:
- Side Impact Front:
- Side Impact Rear:
- Rollover Rating:

The National Highway Traffic Safety Administration's (www.safercar.gov) ratings (4dr):

- Passenger:
- Driver:
- Side Impact Front:
- Side Impact Rear:
- Rollover Rating:

== Powertrain ==
S-TEC

- 1.2 L (73 cu in) SOHC I4 – South Korea, Europe, India, China

E-TEC II

- 1.4 L (85 cu in) SOHC I4 – Europe
- 1.4 L (85 cu in) DOHC I4 – Europe, Ecuador, Colombia, Chile, India, Philippines
- 1.5 L (92 cu in) SOHC I4 – South Korea, Europe, South Africa, Philippines, Pakistan, Ukraine, Egypt
- 1.6 L (98 cu in) DOHC I4 – Colombia, North America, Venezuela, Australia, China, India, Ukraine

== Marketing and production ==
Besides production in Bupyeong, South Korea (between 2002 and 2011), the Kalos and Aveo models have also been assembled in Poland (2007–2011), Ukraine (2004–2017), Russia (2005–2012), Kazakhstan, Ecuador, Colombia, Venezuela, China, India, Thailand, Egypt and Mexico.

=== Asia ===
==== South Korea ====
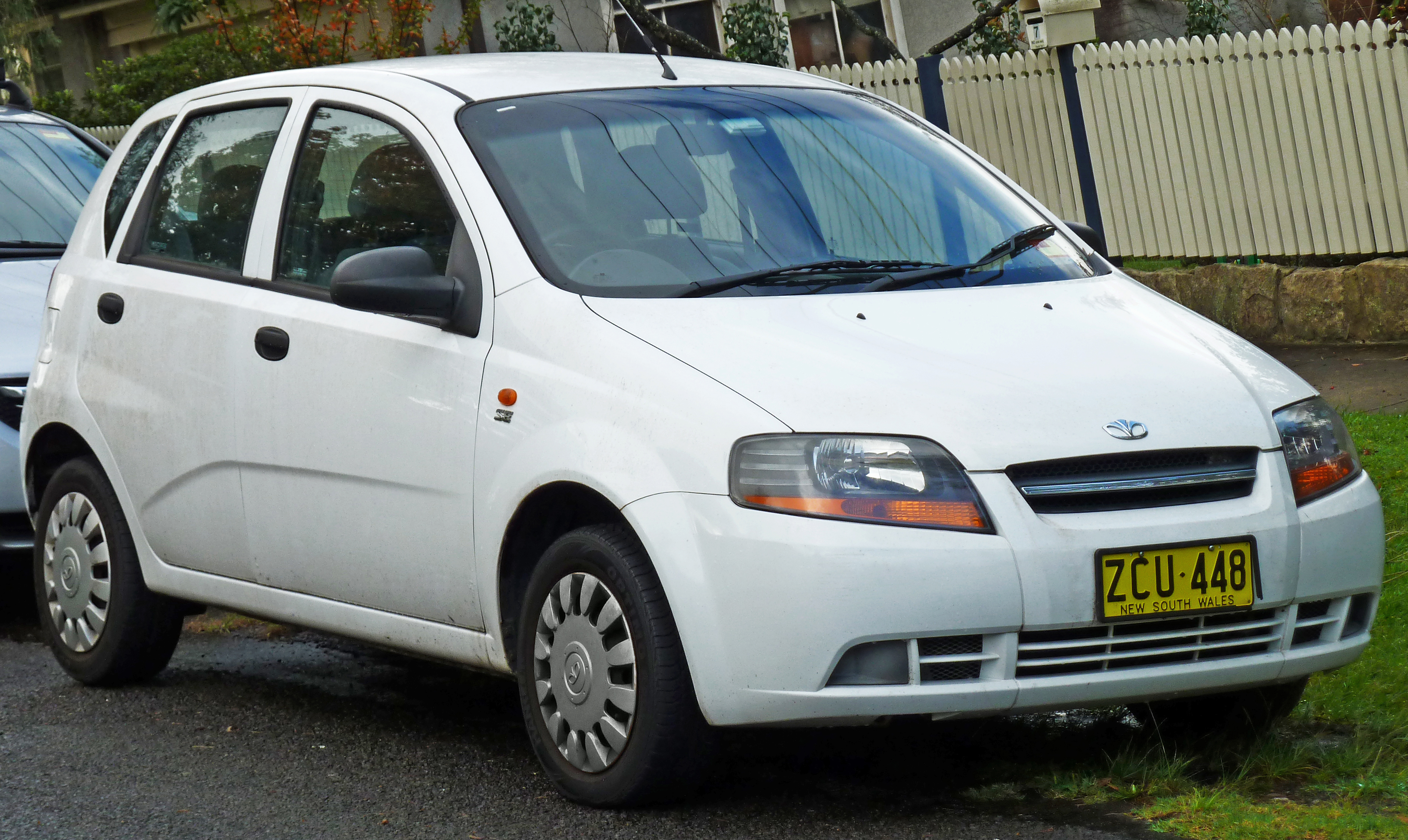
Daewoo Kalos SE five-door (T200) (Pre-facelift)

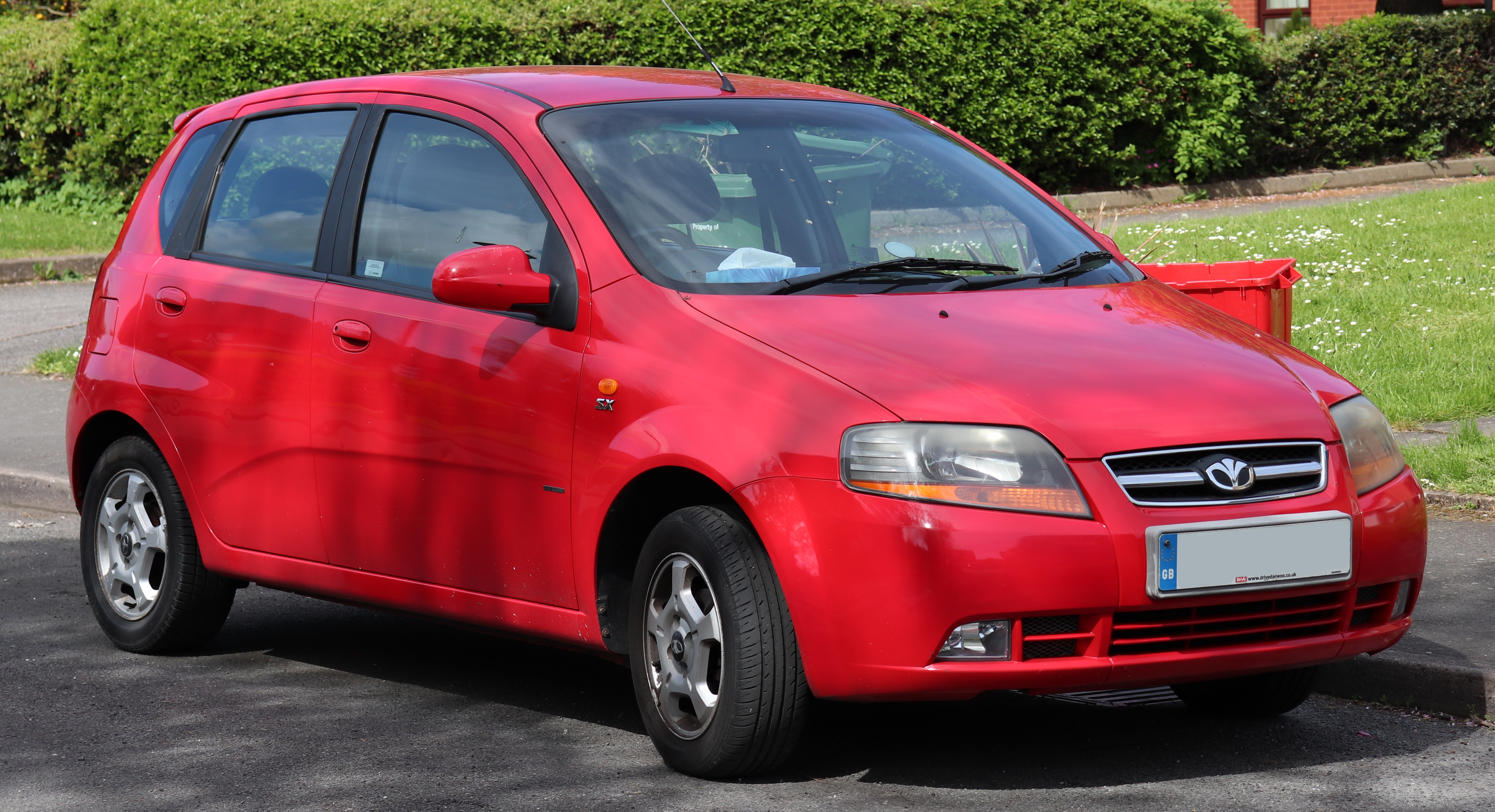
Daewoo Kalos SX five-door (T200) (Post-facelift)

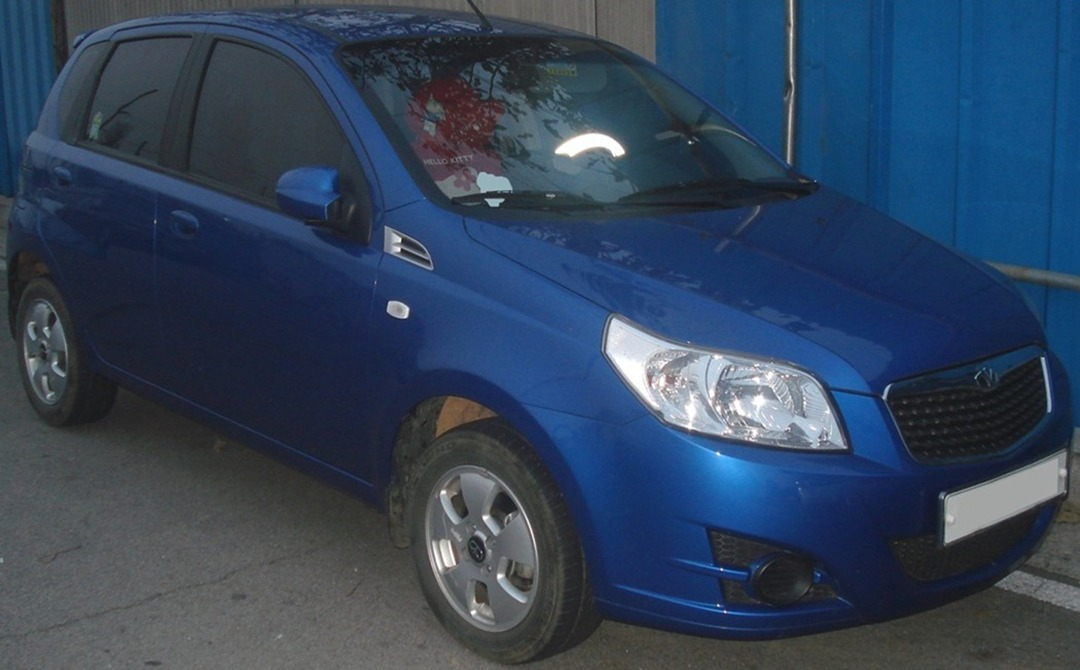
Daewoo Gentra five-door (T250)

The T200 was sold as Daewoo Kalos; the hatchback named 'Kalos V' and the sedan simply Kalos. The tagline from the very first advertisements was 'It's beautiful – Hi! Kalos'. Daewoo began selling the T250 sedan in September 2005 as the Daewoo Gentra, replacing the Kalos sedan. "Gentra" is derived from the English word "gentleman" and "transportation". The tagline in the advertising campaign introducing the Gentra in Korea was "Are you gentle?", and the campaign starred Daniel Henney. In October 2007, the Kalos hatchback adopted the T250 underpinnings and was renamed Gentra X. The Kalos won, twice consecutively (2003 and 2004), the Korea Design Power Index (KDPI) conducted by the Korean Management Association (KMA) and deriving from interviews and an internet polling of 20,000 consumers in Korea's six largest cities.

==== China ====
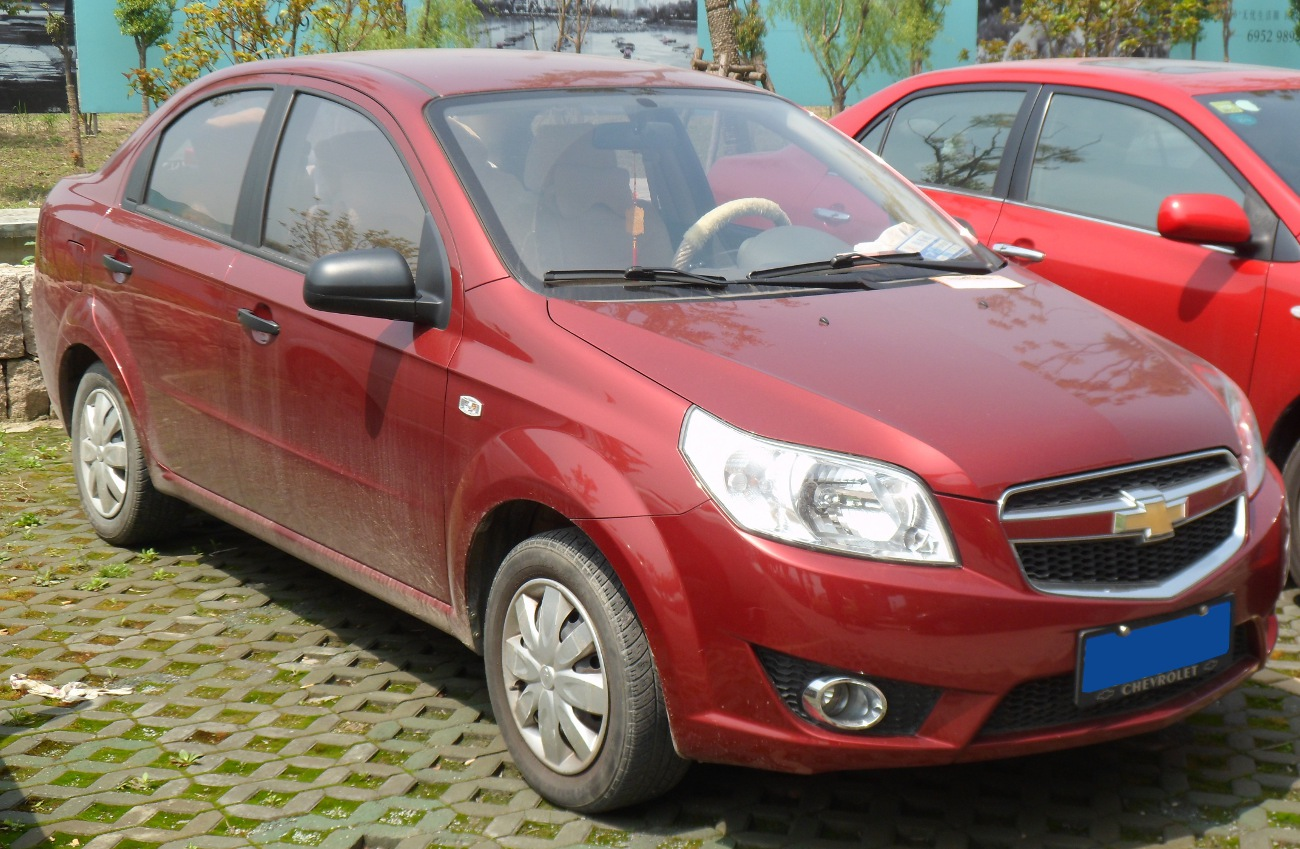
2009 Chevrolet Lova facelift (China)

The T250 sedan is sold as the "Chevrolet Lova" in China. It was facelifted in March 2009, receiving the front end of the T250 hatchback.

In January 2010, Shanghai GM launched the similar-sized Chevrolet Sail sedan. It was developed in China and is based on the second generation of GM's Gamma platform, which has been designed by GM Korea. This was followed by a hatchback version, introduced in June the same year.

==== India ====
The T250 was launched in India in 2006 as Chevrolet Aveo along with the slogan "An Indian Revolution", referencing Chevrolet's An American Revolution ad campaign. The T200 hatchback was sold in India as the Chevrolet Aveo U-VA from December 2006 until 2012. The Aveo was promoted in the Bollywood film Ta Ra Rum Pum with decals on the race cars, but the cars were ARCA-spec Chevrolet Monte Carlos. The television commercial of the Chevrolet Aveo UV-A features Bollywood actor Saif Ali Khan.

==== Thailand ====
The T250 Sedan is sold as the Chevrolet Aveo in Thailand. In February 2008, the Aveo was awarded the ‘Green Label’ environmental certificate by the Thailand Environmental Institute, being recognized for its 'minimal impact on the environment in comparison to other passenger cars in Thailand'. This made Chevrolet the first automobile brand in Thailand to have won this award twice in a row. As of 2010, the Chevrolet Aveo is sold with either a 1,399 cc or 1,598 cc 16V DOHC E-TEC II engine with VGIS variable length intake manifold. The 1.4 grades are MT Manual transmission or AT Automatic transmission 'Base', MT/AT 'LS' and AT 'LSX'. The 1.6 grades are AT only 'LT', 'LSX', 'LUX' and 'SS'. All models except the 1.6 LT are configured to use E20 fuel.

==== Vietnam ====
As of 2011, VIDAMCO of Vietnam produces the T250 sedan in complete knock-down (CKD) form at its Hanoi production facility. The VIDAMCO model was launched in Vietnam on January 20, 2006, under the name "Daewoo Gentra".

=== Australia ===
The T200 model was available as the "Daewoo Kalos" before Daewoo's Australian operations ceased at the end of 2004 and was absent from the Australian market until re-introduced in December 2005 as the TK Holden Barina (3-door and 5-door). The TK Barina replaced the previous XC Barina, which was an imported and rebadged European Opel Corsa. The T250 sedan was introduced in February 2006, and both the T200 and T250 models are sold together as the Barina lineup. The switch from the Opel-sourced Corsa was criticized, given the Kalos' lower ANCAP safety performance. The T250 hatchback, both 3-door and 5-door, was introduced in August 2008.

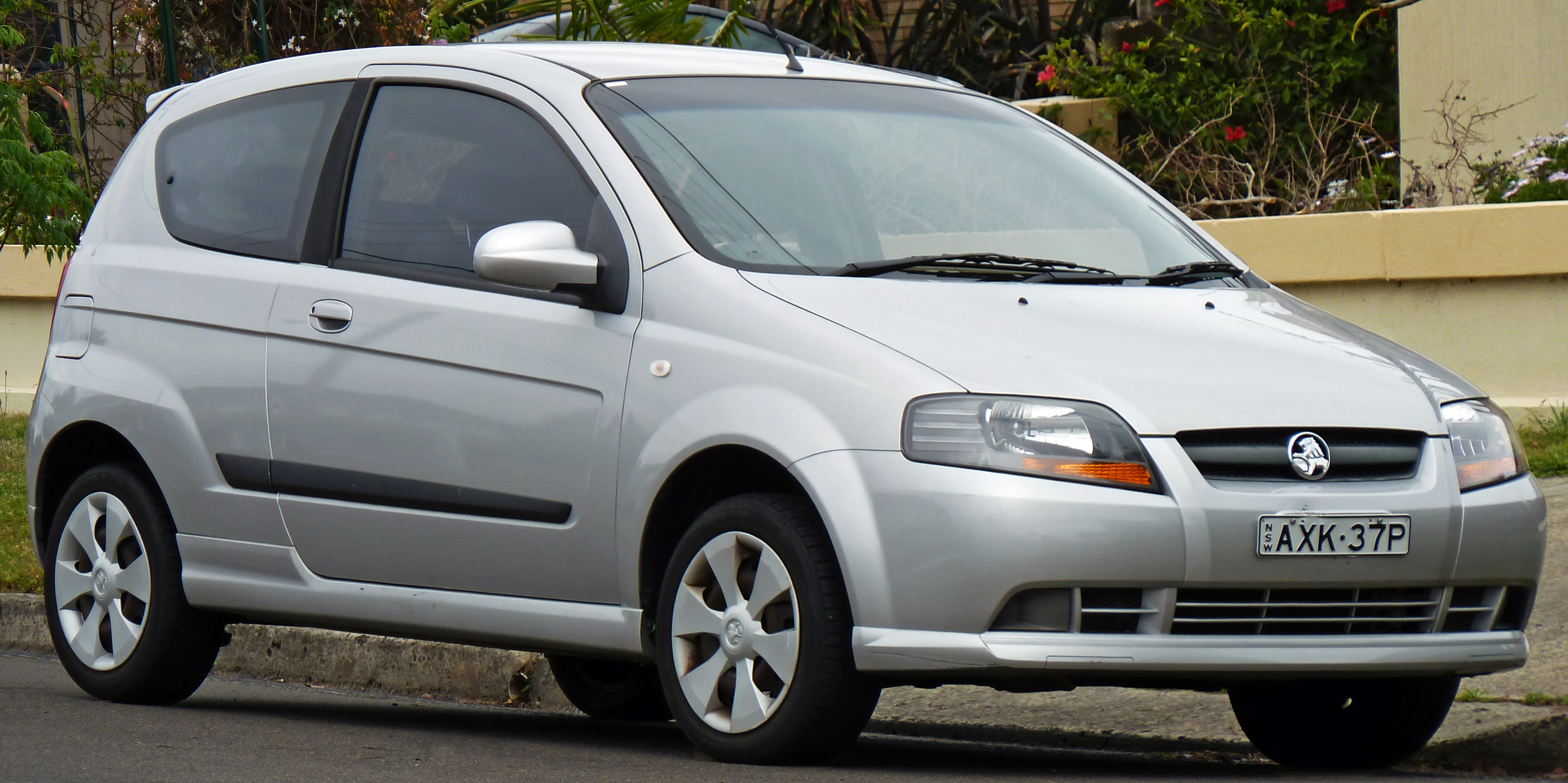
Holden Barina (TK) 3-door (T200)

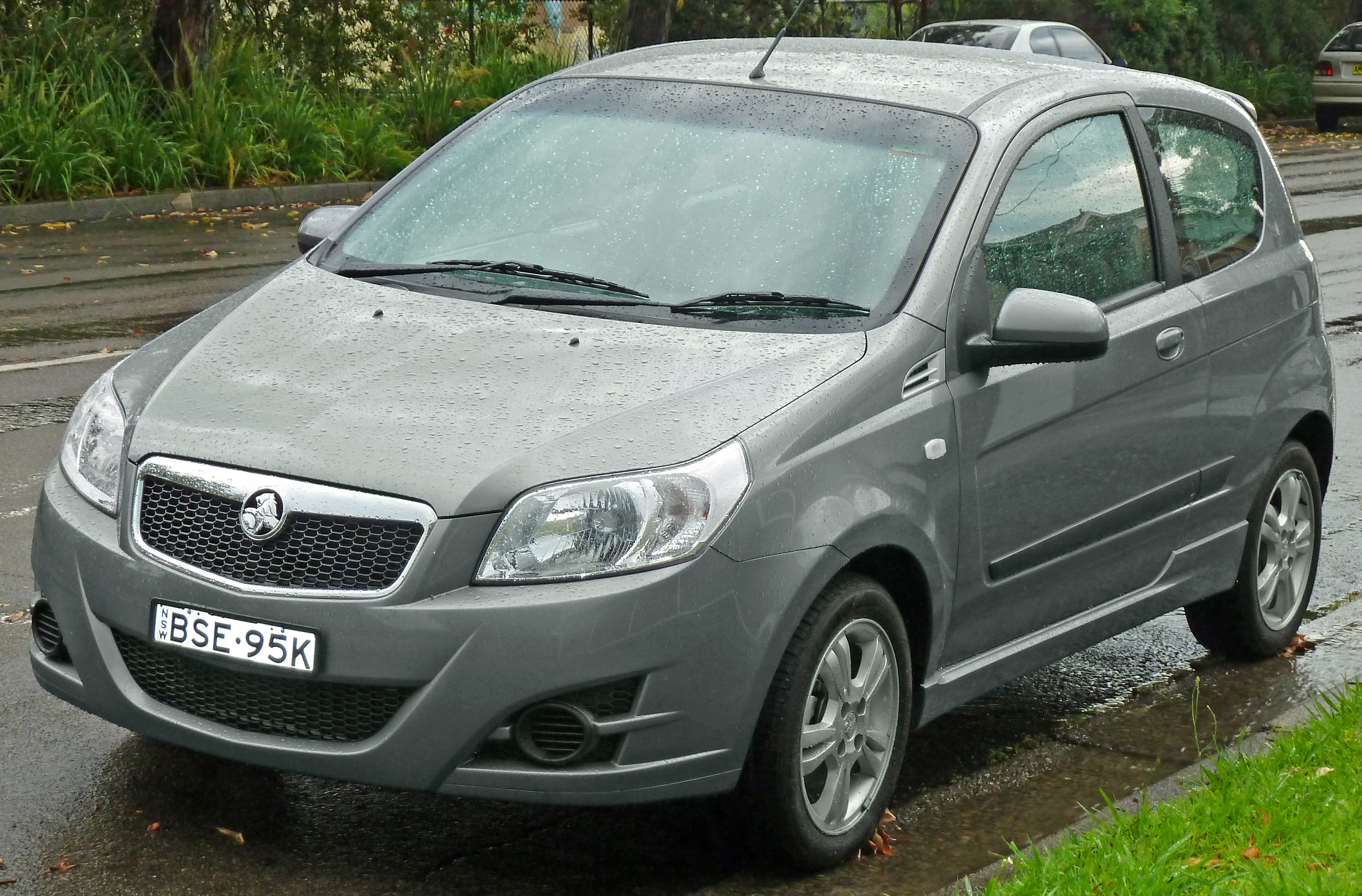
Holden Barina (TK) 3-door (T250)

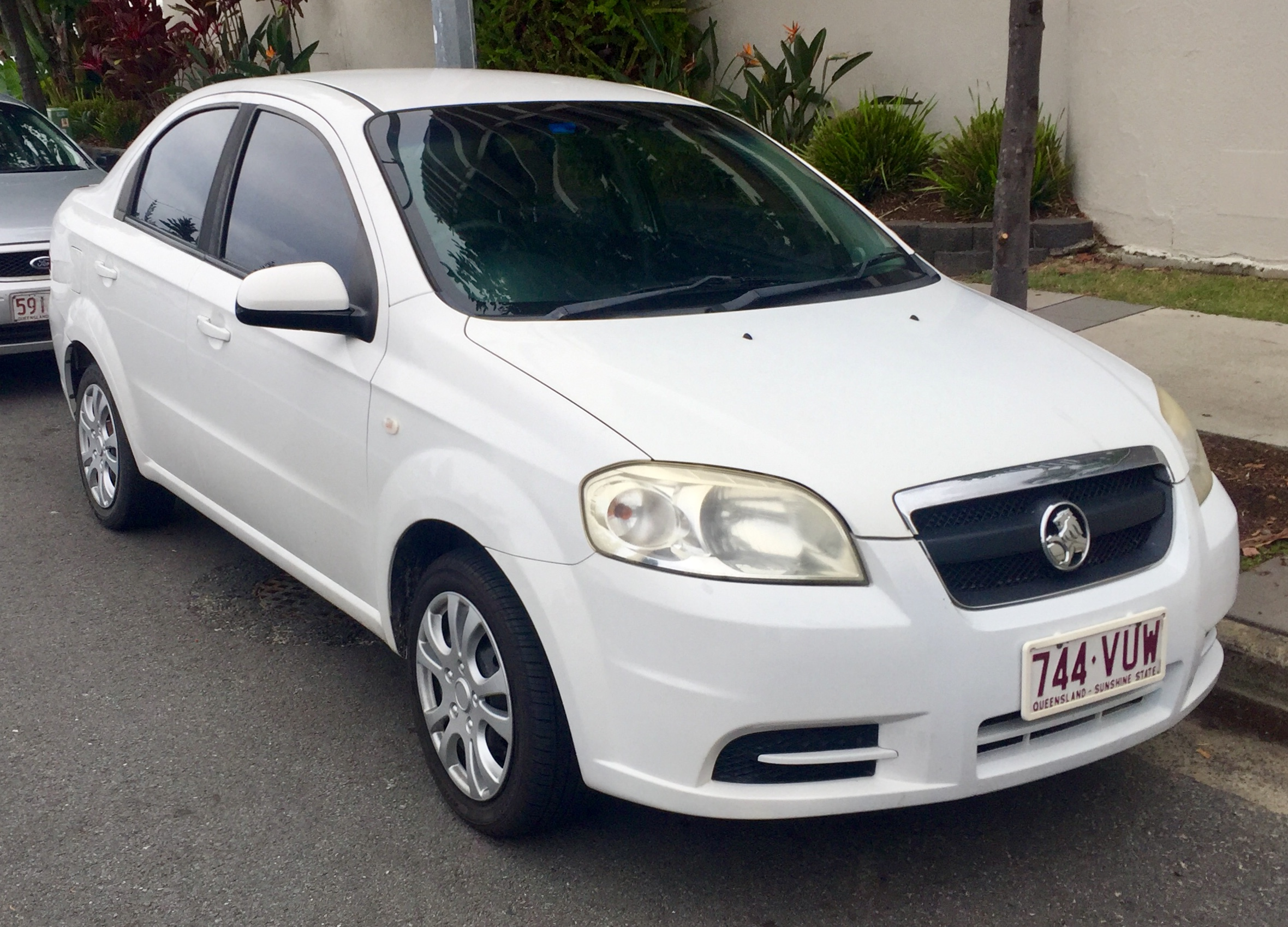
Holden Barina (TK) sedan (T250)

=== Europe ===
Until the end of 2004, the T200 was sold as "Daewoo Kalos" in Western Europe. In early 2005, the Chevrolet brand replaced the Daewoo brand and the Kalos was rebadged the "Chevrolet Kalos", coinciding with the introduction of the three-door. The new T250 sedan is marketed as the "Chevrolet Aveo" replacing the Kalos sedan in 2006. A revised hatchback was introduced in the 2007 Frankfurt Motor Show, to go on sale in early 2008 as the Aveo—replacing the Kalos. In Italy there exists a variant of the Aveo called the Chevrolet Aveo Eco Logic. This low emission version has a dual power LPG engine 1.2 and 1.4 16V.

The T200 was sold in Eastern Europe as "Chevrolet Aveo" from its introduction in 2003. The T250 has replaced the T200 sedan in 2006, retaining the same name. Versions sold in this region had 1.4 L engines, and were available as both five-door hatchback and four-door sedan. In 2006 it was announced that FSO in Warsaw, Poland, would begin assembling the Aveo under a joint venture between GM and FSO's owner, the Ukrainian company UkrAVTO. Production of the sedan started in November 2007, while the hatchback was assembled from July 2008. Starting from April 2008, they were delivered in the rest of the European markets too. Production in Poland ended in February 2011, when UkrAVTO decided moving it to Ukraine, where it would be assembled only for the local market and the CIS states. This comes also as an effect of the free trade agreement reached between South Korea and the European Union, that took effect from 1 July 2011. In March 2012, UkrAVTO began to manufacture the car on full-scale under the ZAZ brand. Originally it was planned to name the car "ZAZ Point" but in production the name was changed to "ZAZ Vida".

In 2012 in Moscow ZAZ unveiled the ZAZ Vida Special Version. It was an Aveo sedan with a front bumper of a hatchback. It was planned to equip it with 1.4 L Mexican engine. The car had never made it into a serial production.

In 2016 ZAZ introduced the panel van version of ZAZ Vida called ZAZ Vida Cargo. It had a load capacity of 450kg and was shorter that its passenger variants. In 2017 it effectively replaced sedan and hatchback on a production line and had been sold until 2020.

In Russia, it was produced by the Kaliningrad-based company Avtotor, since 2005, using semi-knock down technology. It was removed from the range at the beginning of 2012, when the new generation of the Aveo was introduced on the market.

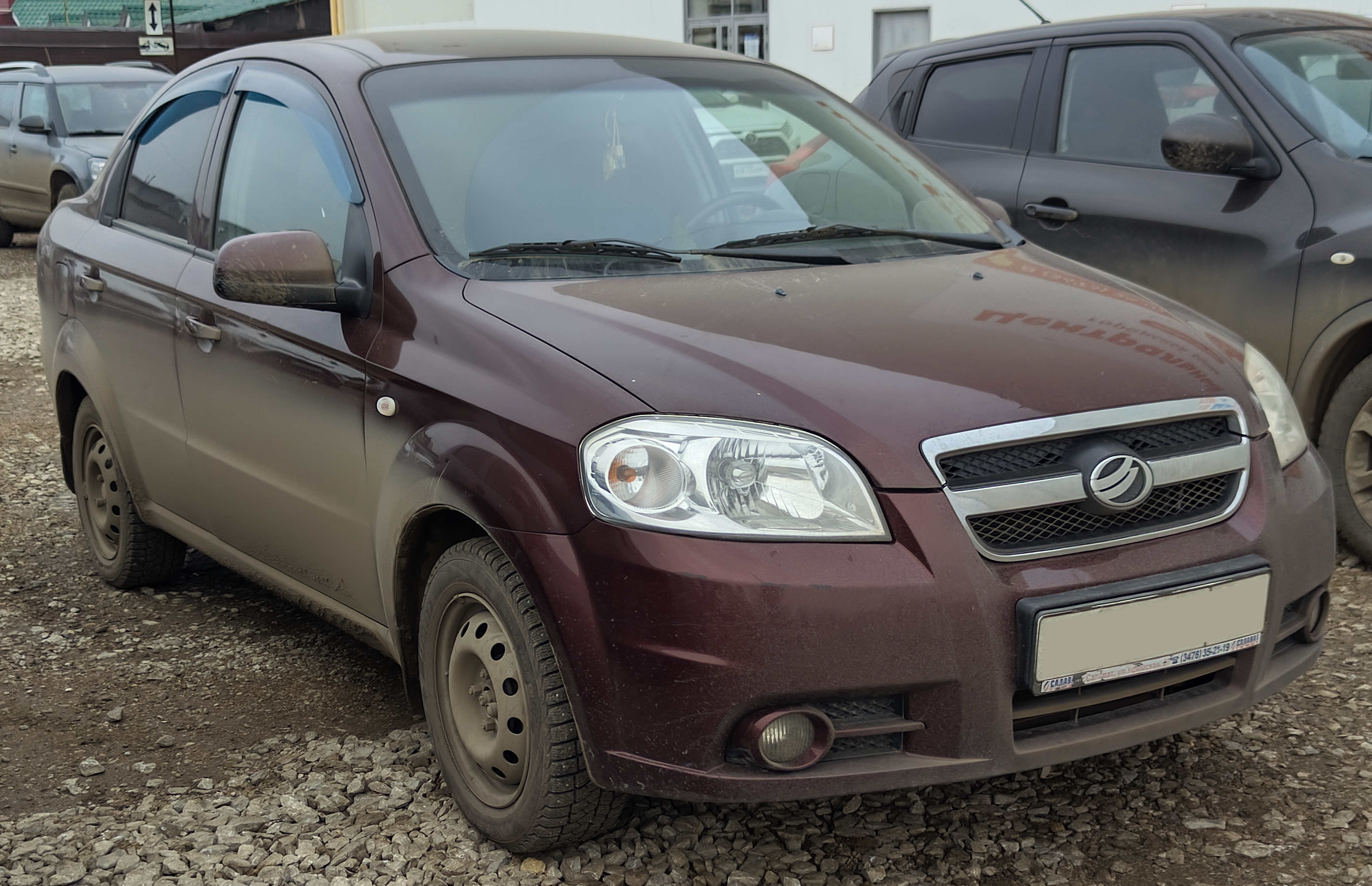
ZAZ Vida sedan

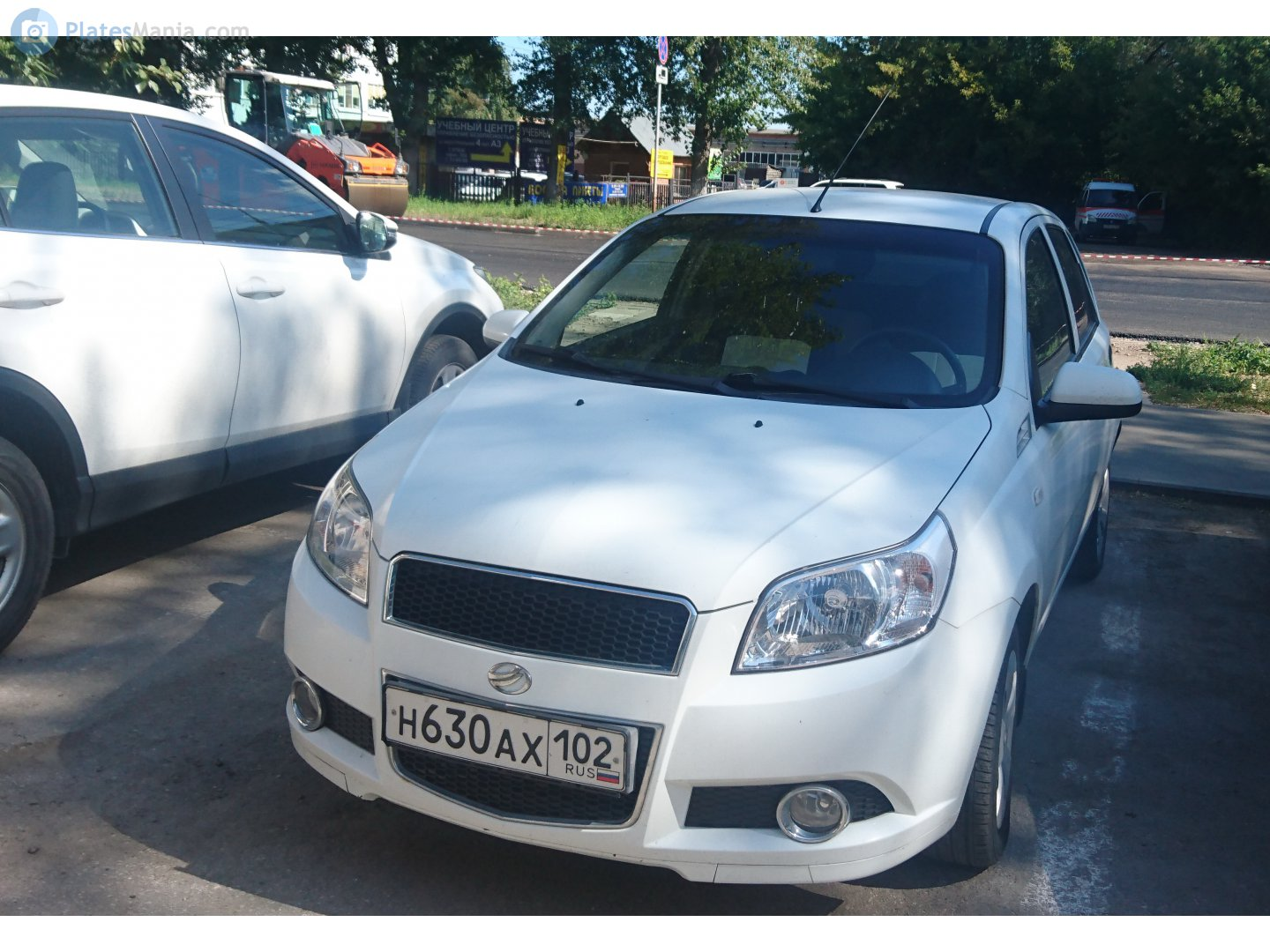
ZAZ Vida hatchback

=== North America ===
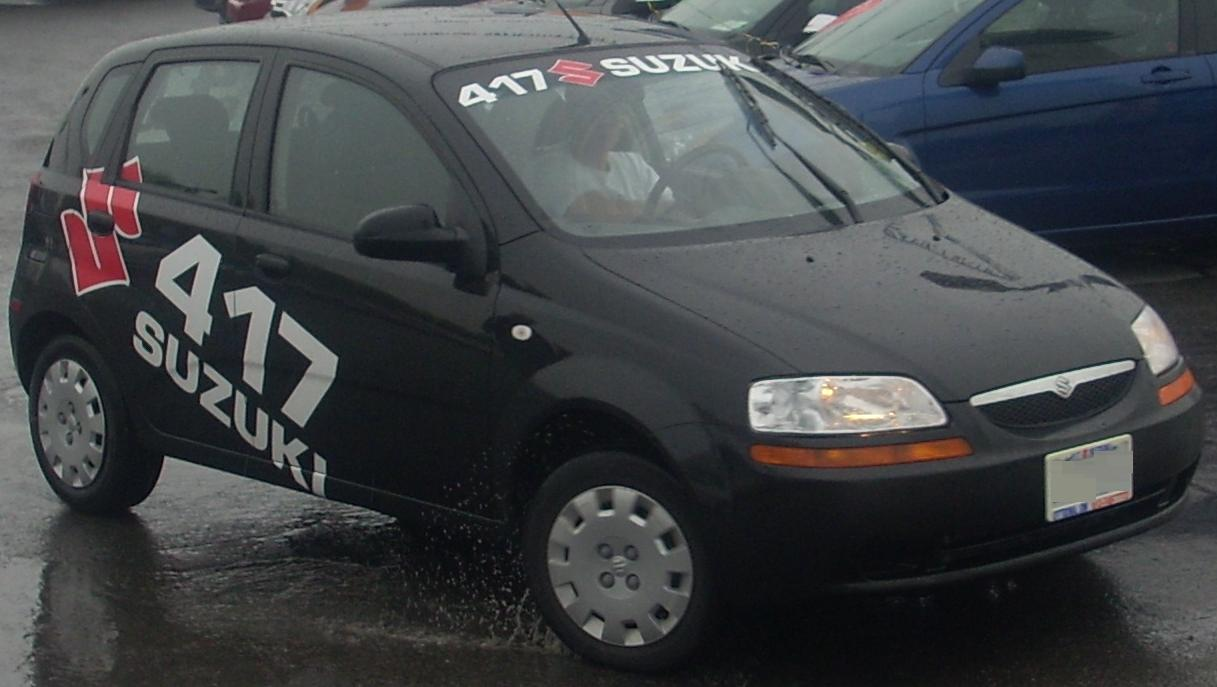
Suzuki Swift+

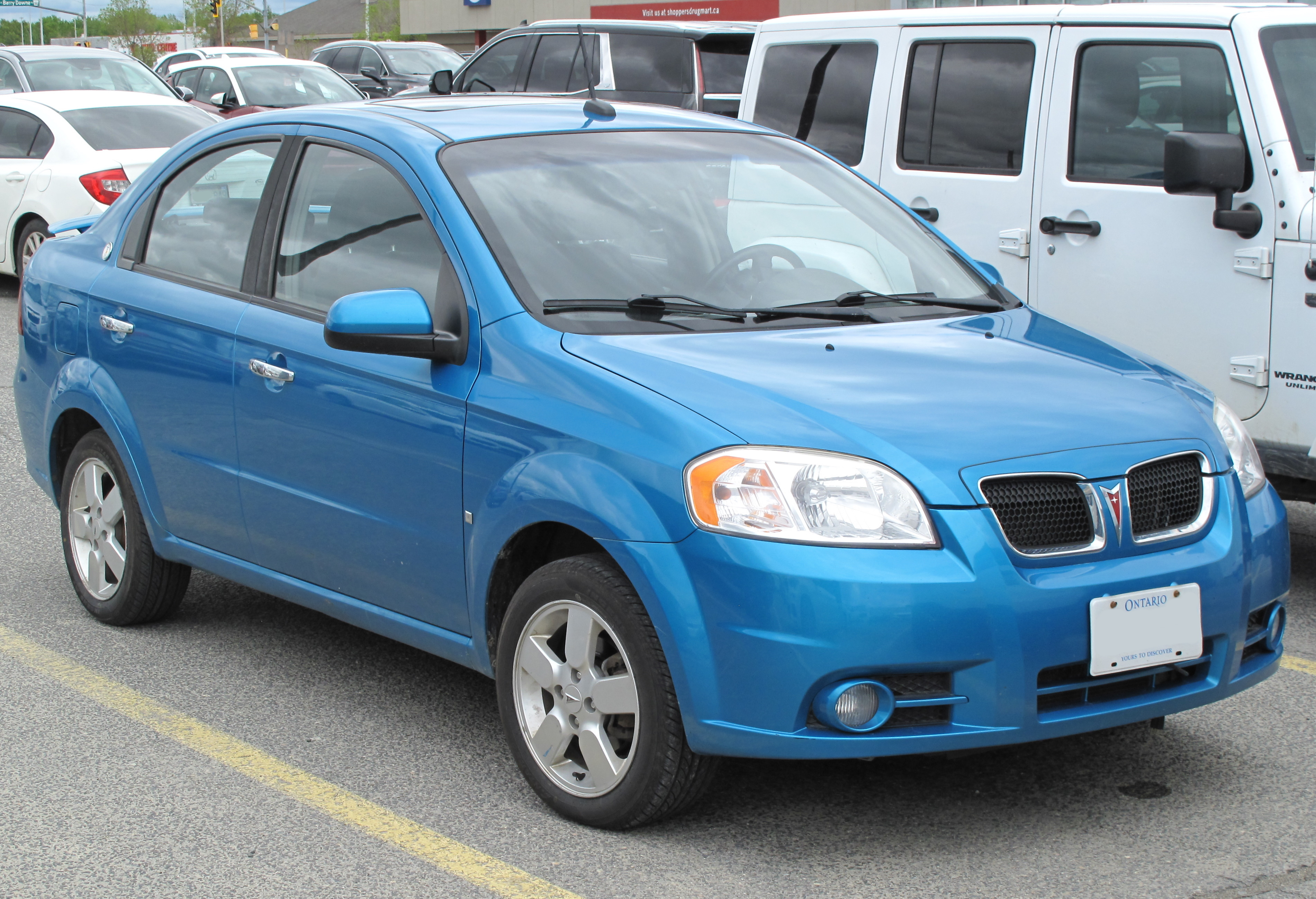
Pontiac G3 Wave

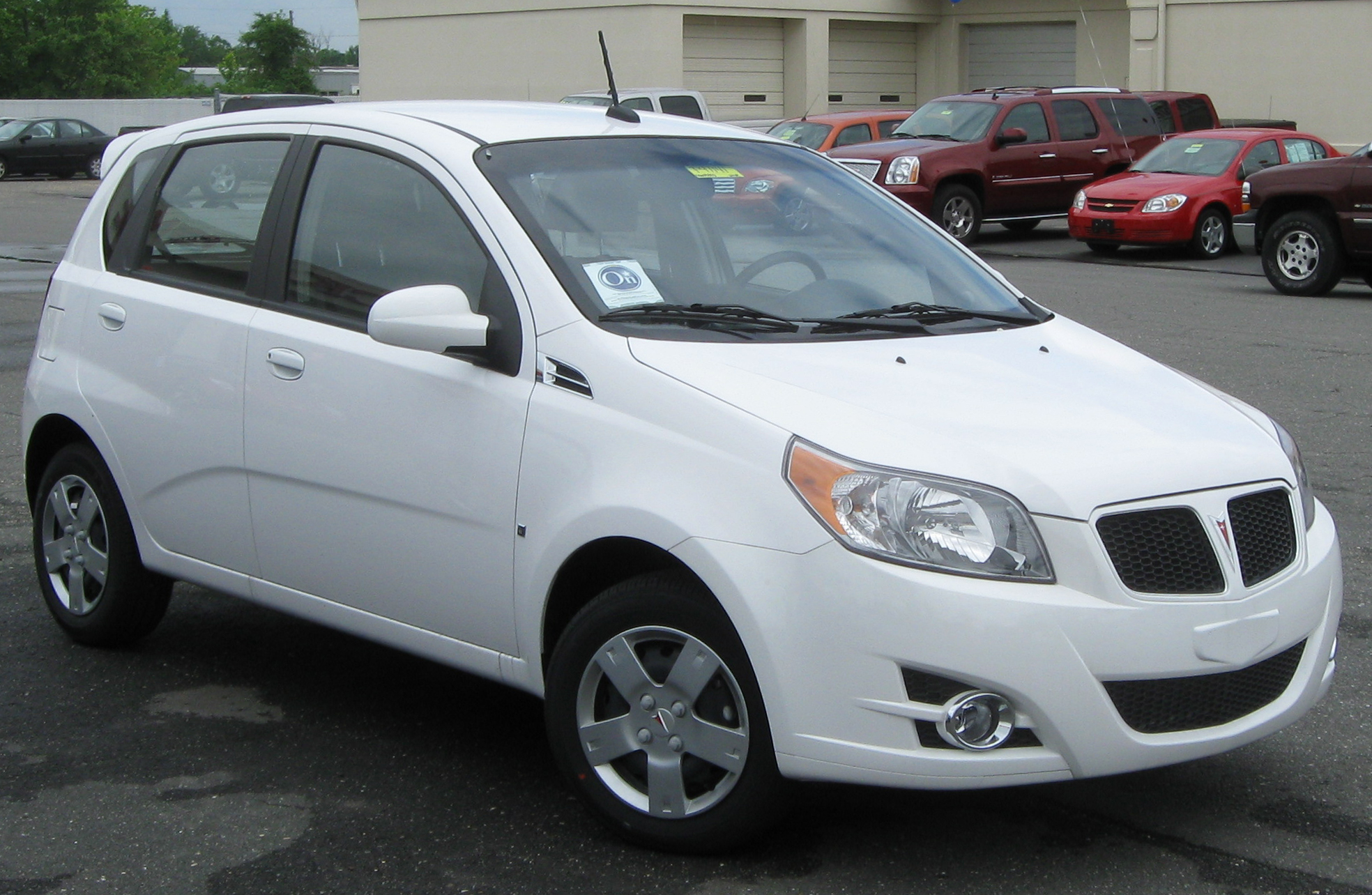
Pontiac G3

The T200 models were introduced to the US and Canada 2004 models at the February 2003 Chicago Auto Show as the Chevrolet Aveo to replace the Daewoo Lanos when Daewoo withdrew from many markets outside South Korea in 2002. The US 5-door and 4-door models went on sale in November 2003, and as reported by the Boston Globe in November 2006, "the Aveo (was) the largest-selling subcompact in the United States".

The Aveo was introduced for its market debut in a 60-second television advertisement that first appeared on New Year's Eve 2003, created by the firm of Campbell-Ewald, directed by Michael Bay and featuring the song Magic Carpet Ride by Steppenwolf. The advertisement was titled "An American Revolution, Car Carrier" and featured six yet to be introduced cars and trucks boarding a car carrier as it traversed the United States. It featured the Aveo descending the Twin Peaks of San Francisco and making an airborne leap highly reminiscent of Steve McQueen's Ford Mustang in the movie Bullitt, before boarding the car carrier. Two other fifteen second TV ads also created by the firm of Campbell-Ewald, spotlighted the Aveo: "Pachyderm" showing an elephant, chased down a city street by an Aveo and "Big Little," in which four basketball players who enter the car appear tiny in big seats, highlighting the vehicle's interior volume.

In February 2004, GM issued a "stop delivery" order, to investigate five accidents that occurred in a tight time frame just as the Aveo was introduced to the US market. The order was lifted shortly thereafter, after an investigation revealed no connection among the accidents.

The T250 sedan debuted in January 2006 as the 2007 Chevrolet Aveo at the Greater Los Angeles Auto Show. Sales commenced in North America in August 2006. Also, 2007 is the first model year of the Pontiac G3 and 2009 is the first model year of the Aveo for Mexican sales, replacing the Opel-based Chevrolet Corsa.

The Aveo 5-door hatchback was marketed as the "Aveo5" in Canada since its inception and in the US beginning with model year 2007. The models were sold as Pontiac Wave (4-door and 5-door, since the 2005 model year) and Suzuki Swift+ (5-door) in Canada. The T200 Wave sedan was replaced for the 2007 model year with the T250, coinciding with the release of the 2007 T250 Aveo. For the 2009 model year, Pontiac Wave was renamed to Pontiac G3 Wave in Canada. In the United States, Pontiac sold the 5-door hatchback as the Pontiac G3 starting in the spring of 2009. Because of General Motors phasing out the Pontiac brand, the Pontiac G3/Wave is no longer manufactured after the 2010 model year, and the last Pontiac G3 Wave rolled off the line in December 2009, making this the last overall Pontiac vehicle to roll off the line, even though the last Pontiac for the American market was the 2010 Pontiac G6. The Pontiac G3 has the distinction of being the last Pontiac-badged model introduced to the United States market before the brand's 2010 demise. For the 2010 model year, Canadian models are simply referred to as Pontiac G3.

In Mexico, the T250 sedan went on sale as a 2009 model, replacing the Opel-based Chevrolet Corsa and GM Daewoo-built Pontiac G3, after the GM announcement of discontinuing the Pontiac brand following the 2009 model year in Mexico and the 2010 model year elsewhere. It is produced in San Luis Potosi, Mexico. From the May 2010 model year, the GM badges next to the doors were removed. From the 2012 model year, the Aveo underwent a facelift, receiving a similar front-end to that of the hatchback. By this time, it was no longer sold in the United States and Canada. The Aveo T250's production in Mexico ended in 2017 and it will be replaced by a China assembled Chevrolet Sail carrying the Aveo name.

For the Canadian market the Swift+ was created with a joint between GM Daewoo and Suzuki, after Suzuki stopped selling the previous model Swift in 2001. The Swift+, a version of the Daewoo Kalos, was introduced in fall 2003 and marketed solely as a 5-door hatchback. For the 2009 model year, the Suzuki Swift+ was updated in styling and a new Opel ECOTEC 106 hp 1.6 engine receiving 7.9 L/100 km for city and 5.7 for highway from the previous 8.9/5.9, shared with the Pontiac G3 Wave and Chevrolet Aveo.

2005: Sidemarker lights change from orange to clear. Black trim applied to B-pillars of all models and C-pillars of hatchbacks.

2006: Rear Spoiler changes from "hugger" style to pedestal style spoiler with several inches of clearance from body.

2007: The four-door Aveo sedan is redesigned, while the five-door hatchback remains unchanged. A new trim level structure for the sedan is introduced that includes base 1LS, midlevel 1LT, and range-topping 2LT trims. Wheel choices are revised, and include both black steel wheel with plastic wheel covers, or aluminum-alloy wheels, in either fourteen-inch or fifteen-inch diameters. Exterior changes include new lighting with "Altezza-Style" rear tail lamps and available front fog lamps, and new front headlamps. A new chrome front grille is added that takes cues from other vehicles in the Chevrolet lineup. Interior changes include new audio systems (an A/M-F/M stereo radio for base models, or an A/M-F/M stereo radio with a single-disc CD/MP3 player (upgradeable to a newly available, six-disc, in-dash CD/MP3 changer) on upgraded models, both with a 3.5-millimeter (3.5mm) auxiliary audio input jack, and either a four-speaker audio system or a six-speaker audio system with separate "A"-pillar mounted tweeters), a redesigned dashboard, and an available Neutral (Beige) interior color combination. Power is still delivered by a 1.6L EcoTec Inline Four-Cylinder gasoline engine, now producing 103 horsepower and 107 lb. ft. of torque, and mated to either a four-speed automatic transmission, or a five-speed manual transmission, regardless of trim level.

2009: The five-door Aveo hatchback is redesigned and renamed the Aveo 5. A new emblem signifying the name change is applied to the rear hatch. A wider, split front grille and more angular front headlamps, as well as optional front fog lamps, are added. All Aveos are still powered by the 1.6L EcoTec Inline Four-Cylinder (I4) gasoline engine, though horsepower is up by 3 horsepower to 106 horsepower (up from 103 horsepower), and torque is down to 105 lb. ft. of torque from 107 lb. ft. of torque. Transmission choices remain either a five-speed manual or four-speed automatic, regardless of trim level. Trim levels are also restructured to base 1LS, midlevel 1LT, and range-topping 2LT. Upscale features available on upper trims include the OnStar in-vehicle telematics system, SiriusXM Satellite Radio, a six-speaker premium audio system with "A"-pillar mounted tweeters, a power, tilt-and-sliding sunroof, a leather-wrapped steering wheel with available remote audio system and cruise controls, fifteen-inch aluminum-alloy wheels, and perforated leatherette-trimmed seating surfaces with perforated front and rear door panel inserts, and faux wood interior trim panels on Aveos equipped with the Neutral (Beige) interior. A rebadged version of the Aveo 5 becomes available in the United States, called the Pontiac G3 (also called the Pontiac Wave in other markets), although unlike the Wave, the United States version is not available in four-door sedan form. The G3 is only offered for the 2009 model year, as Pontiac also enters its last full model year.

2010: GM badges disappear on Chevrolet Aveo models, even though early 2010 models did have GM badges. Also, the G3 enters its final model year only in Canada, but drops the "Wave" name, making the Pontiac G3 nameplate exclusive to Canada after the United States & Mexico dropped the Pontiac G3 name.

2011: The Aveo enters its final model year in North America with few changes, as it is replaced by the all-new Chevrolet Sonic for the 2012 model year, based on the Chevrolet Aveo that keeps its name in other countries.

The Aveo has received mixed reviews, while it has earned praise from many for its very low price tag, liverly performance, and its rust-resistant galvanized steel body.

- One of Forbes.com's 'Worst-Made Cars On The Road'
- 'Worst in overall safety' from Consumer Reports
- The Aveo and Aveo5 placed 2nd and 3rd on Consumer Report's list of 'Worst in Fuel Economy' for subcompact cars.
- NDTV Profit Car India Awards 2007 Small Car of the Year, Chevrolet Aveo U-VA, NDTV Profit, India's leading business news channel, in association with Car India and Bike India.
- The Aveo sedans and Aveo5 placed 12th and 8th respectively in Consumer Reports 2007 Least satisfying Cars, with 44% of owners expressing inclined to buy again.

United States Chevrolet Aveo sales numbers: 2002:68 2003:5,677 2004:56,642 2005:68,085 2006:58,244 2007:67,028 2008:55,360 2009:38,516(Pontiac:14) 2010:48,623(Pontiac:6,233) 2011:28,601(Pontiac:3) 2012:67(leftover 2011's)

=== South America ===
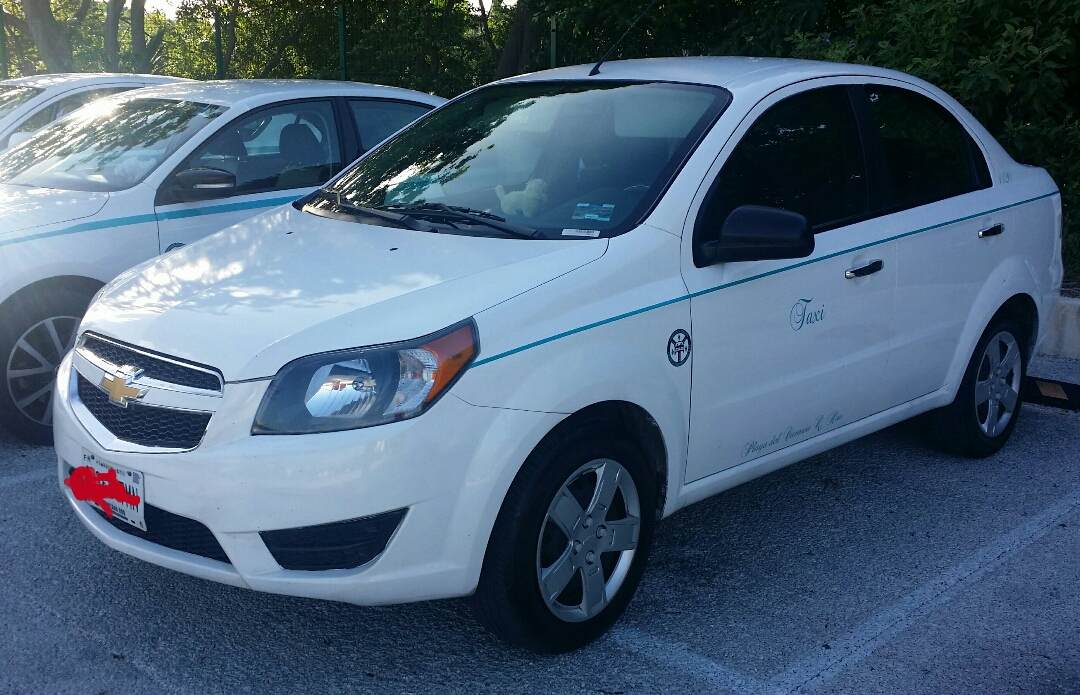
2017 Chevrolet Aveo (Mexico)

The T200 has been sold as the Chevrolet Aveo in Peru (3-door and 5-door), Venezuela, Colombia, Chile, Ecuador (all body styles), and Argentina (4-door). A taxi version of the T200 sedan is still available in Ecuador. The T250 has also been marketed as the Chevrolet Aveo in Peru (4-door).

The facelifted 2012 Chevrolet Aveo, built in Mexico, is also exported to Argentina, where it is marketed as the Aveo G3. It continued to be in production until 2017, when the T250 was succeeded by the third generation Chevrolet Sail (badged as Aveo in Central American markets).
