= Ecotec =

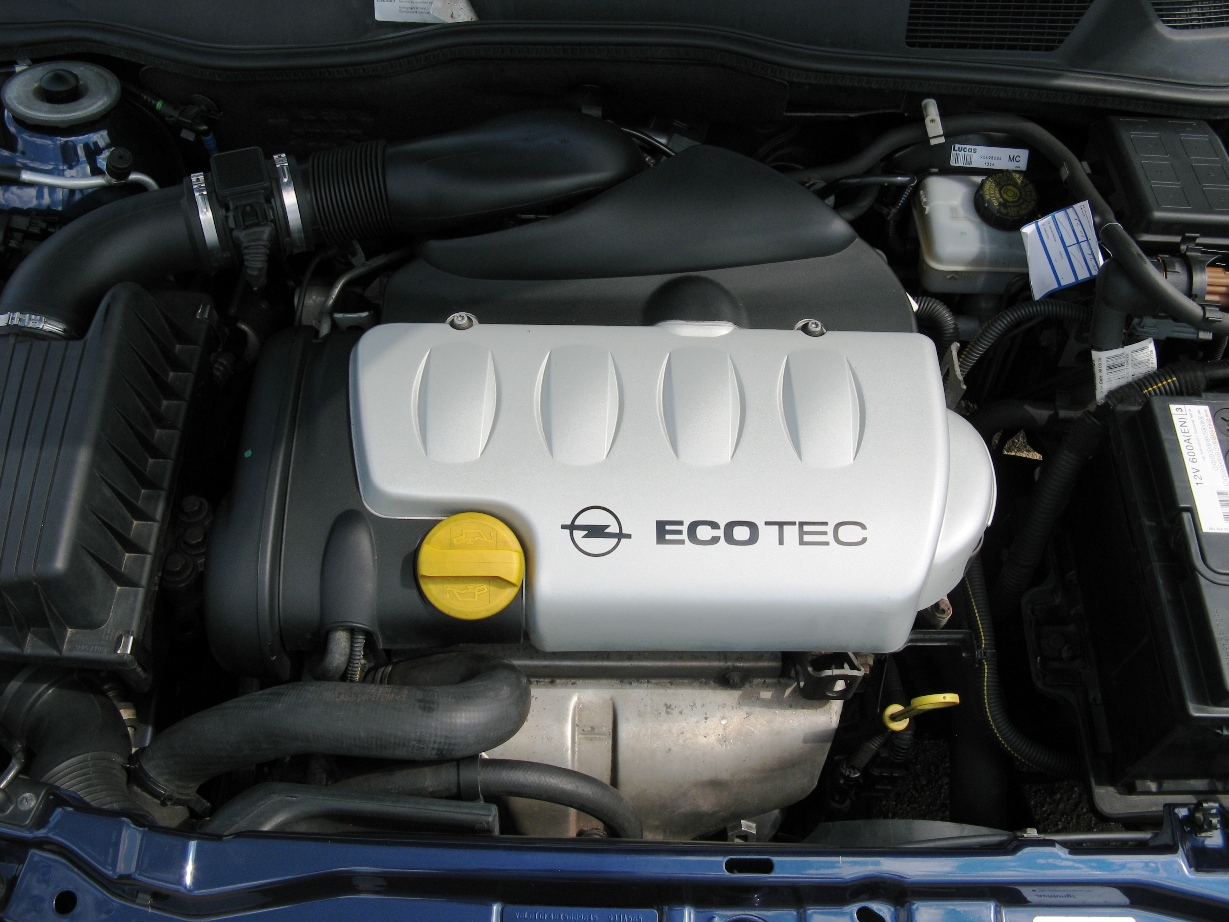
Opel X18XE1 EcoTec engine

Ecotec (capitalized ECOTEC, from "Emissions Control Optimization TEChnology") is a General Motors (GM) and Opel Automobile GmbH (Opel) trademark that refers to a series of emissions technologies that were implemented throughout a range of GM engines. ECOTEC can refer to the following diesel and petrol engines originally produced by General Motors:

- Ecotec Family 0 – straight-four DOHC engines produced by Adam Opel AG and GM Powertrain US.
- Ecotec Family 1 – straight-four SOHC/DOHC engines produced by Adam Opel AG, GM Korea, and GM do Brasil.
- Ecotec Family II – straight-four SOHC/DOHC engines produced by Adam Opel AG, Holden, and GM do Brasil.
- Ecotec L850 – straight-four all-aluminium DOHC engines produced by Adam Opel AG, GM Powertrain US, and Saab Automobile Powertrain AB.
- Ecotec V6 – a version of the Series II 3800 V6 engine, produced by the Holden Engine Company between 1995 and 2004.
- CDTI (Common Rail Diesel Turbo Intercooled) Ecotec – common rail diesel engines for Opel/Vauxhall cars:
  - Originally designed and produced by Fiat (MultiJet) and currently produced by Adam Opel AG. Also produced by Isuzu (Circle L).
- VCDi Ecotec – common rail diesel engines for Chevrolet and Holden cars, produced by GM Korea (a licensed VM Motori RA 420 SOHC and Family Z).
- DTI / DI (Diesel Turbo Intercooled) Ecotec – diesel engines for use in Opel/Vauxhall cars, produced by Isuzu (Circle L).
  - Originally designed and produced by General Motors (GM Ecotec Diesel), replaced by Isuzu (Circle L) and Fiat (MultiJet) engines.
- SIDI (Spark Ignition Direct Injection) Ecotec – petrol Medium Gasoline Engine produced by Adam Opel AG.
- EcoTec3 is the name used on General Motors' Small Block Gen 5 Engines. All include direct injection, cylinder deactivation, and continuously variable valve timing, either in V6 form of 4.3L or V8 form of either 5.3L or 6.2L.

The trademark ECOTEC has also been used on Opel automobiles which are powered by the following engines produced by PSA PowerTrain:

- EB: The ECOTEC trademark is used on the Opel Crossland X and Opel Grandland X equipped with the 110 hp variant (Crossland X) and 130 hp variant (Grandland X) of PSA's EB petrol engine. Lower-powered variants of this engine lack an engine designation, while higher-powered variants (for Crossland X) are designated as TURBO.
