= Buick Riviera (film) =

- Directed by: Goran Rušinović
- Written by: Goran Rušinović
- Based on: Buick Riviera by Miljenko Jergović
- Produced by: Boris T. Matić; Mike Downey; Sam Taylor; Kate Barry
- Starring: Slavko Štimac; Leon Lučev; Aimee Klein; Shawn Miramontes
- Release date: August 18, 2008 (Sarajevo Film Festival)
- Running time: 86 minutes
- Country: Croatia
- Language: English

Buick Riviera is a 2008 drama film by director Goran Rušinović, based on the novel Buick Rivera by Miljenko Jergović. It was awarded the Heart of Sarajevo award as the Best Film at the 2008 Sarajevo Film Festival.

== Cast ==
- Slavko Štimac as Hasan Hujdur
- Leon Lučev as Vuko
- Aimee Klein as Angela
- Krissy Lynn Hibbard as Sara
- Alem Kljako as Father
- Sanela Mahir as Mother
- Emir Hadžihafizbegović as Father (voice)

== Plot ==
Hasan Hujdur is a 42-year-old Muslim from Bosnia living in North Dakota, who finds refuge and contentment behind the wheel of his classic 1965 Buick Riviera. In the Riviera he feels safe, and has some sense of peace and control - but his wife wishes for him to sell the car. Surrounding everything that Hasan loves is a prejudiced world of Anglo Americans afraid of his culture they cannot understand, and a religion they vilify. Hasan is a quiet man who stands distant from his beliefs, however it is these beliefs that inevitably lead to his untimely death.

On the way to pick up his wife from work at the local hospital, he falls asleep at the wheel of his Buick and runs it off the road, getting stuck in the snow. He is discovered by Vuko Salipur, who stops to help him. They both immediately recognise that they are from the same country and both understand the irony of a Bosnian stopping to help another Bosnian in a country full of all different races and colours.

Despite their similar background it soon becomes clear that Muslim Hasan and non-Muslim Vuko are very different. Hasan has not processed the loss of his family and trauma of the war in Bosnia. He is stuck, and afflicted with PTSD. Vuko is violent, manipulative and scheming how he can take advantage.

Their continuing interaction results in ever increasing tension between them, ultimately with tragic consequences.

== Accolades ==
- Best Screenplay. Pula Film Festival 2008. Golden Arena.
- Heart of Sarajevo. Sarajevo Film Festival 2008.
- Best Actor. Slavko Stimac. Leon Lucev. Sarajevo Film Festival 2008.
