= Buick Riviera =

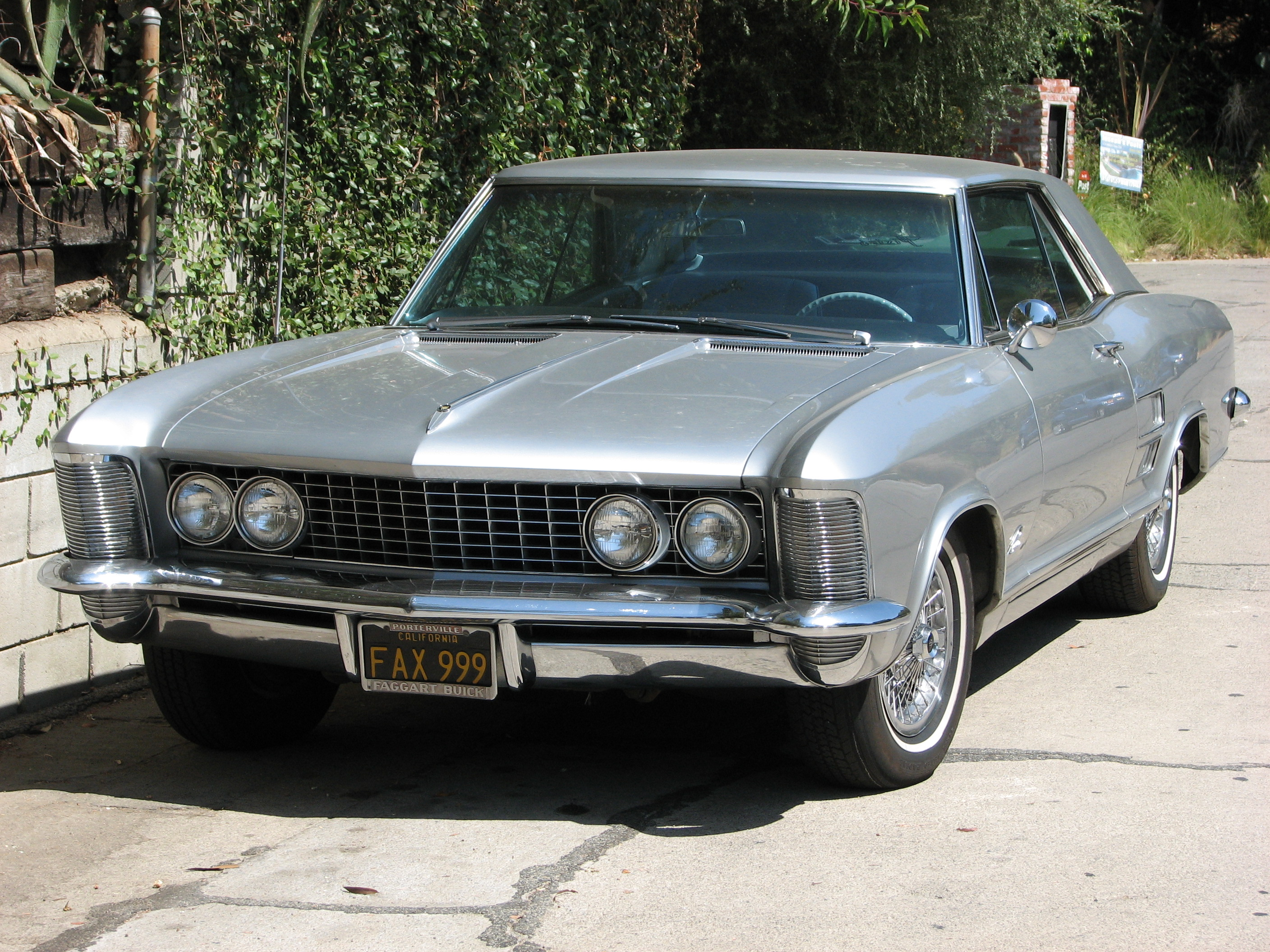
- 1963 Buick Riviera

Overview
- Manufacturer: Buick (General Motors)
- Model years: 1963–1993; 1995–1999

Body and chassis
- Class: Personal luxury car

Chronology
- Predecessor: Buick Super

The Buick Riviera is a personal luxury car that was marketed by Buick from 1963 to 1999, with the exception of the 1994 model year.

As General Motors' first entry into the personal luxury car market segment, the Riviera was highly praised by automotive journalists upon its high-profile debut. It was a ground-up design on a new GM E platform debuting for the 1963 model year and was also Buick's first unique Riviera model.

Unlike its subsequent GM E platform stablemates, the Oldsmobile Toronado and Cadillac Eldorado, the Riviera was initially a front engine/rear-wheel drive platform, switching to front-wheel drive starting with the 1979 model year.

While the early models stayed close to their original form, eight subsequent generations varied substantially in size and styling. A total of 1,127,261 Rivieras were produced.

The Riviera name was resurrected for two concept cars that were displayed at auto shows in 2007 and in 2013.

== Origins ==
=== The Riviera name ===
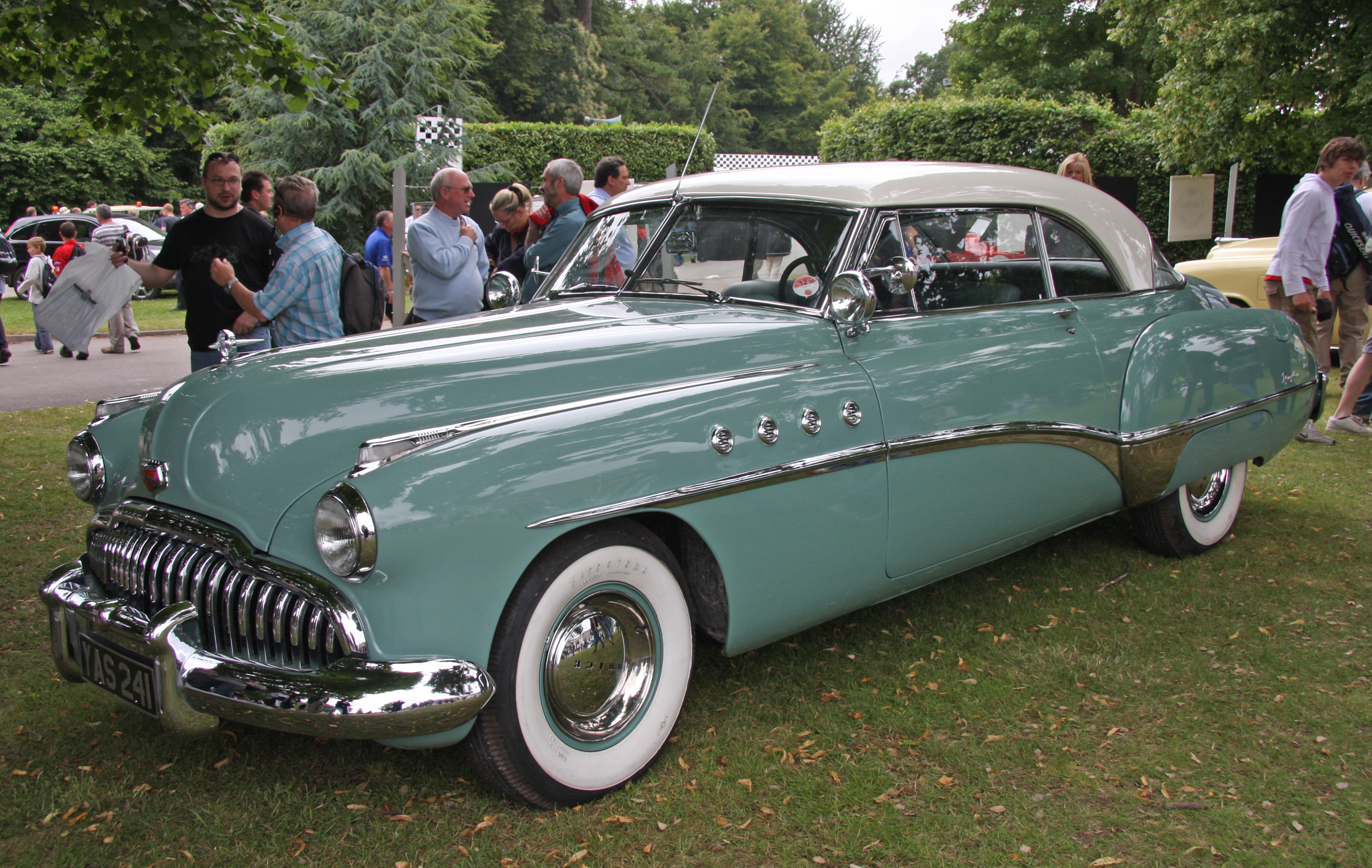
1949 Buick Roadmaster Riviera (one of the first hardtops)

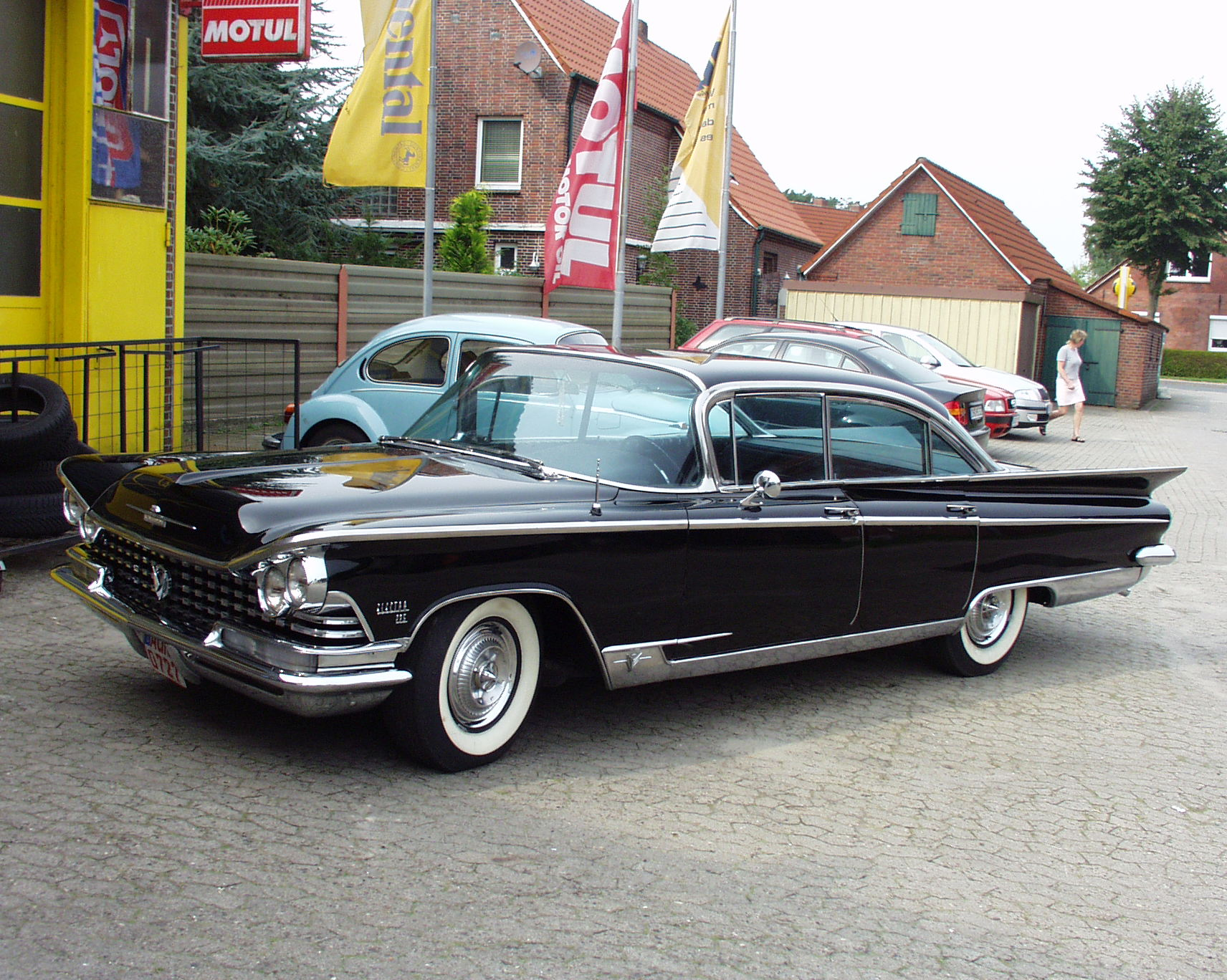
1959 Buick Electra 225 Riviera

The name Riviera, Italian for coastline, was chosen to evoke the allure and affluence of the French Riviera. It first entered the Buick line in 1949, as the designation for the new two-door pillarless hardtop, described in advertising as "stunningly smart". The Buick Roadmaster Riviera coupe (along with the Cadillac Coupe de Ville and Oldsmobile 98 Holiday coupe) constituted the first mass production use of this body style, which was to become popular over the next 30 years. Buick added a two-door Riviera hardtop to the Super the following year, the Special in 1951, and the Century upon its return, after a 12-year absence, in 1954.

From 1951 to 1953 the Riviera designation was given to the existing long-wheelbase versions of the four-door Buick Roadmaster and Super sedans. The 1951–53 Buick Roadmaster and Super four-door Riviera sedans feature more standard features, more plush interior trim, and a wheelbase (and overall length) that is 4.0 inches (102 mm) longer than a regular Buick Roadmaster or Super four-door sedan. The 1951–52 Buick Super four-door Riviera sedan is still 0.75 inches (19 mm) shorter in wheelbase and length than the regular Buick Roadmaster and 4.75 inches (121 mm) shorter than the Roadmaster four-door Riviera sedan. In 1953, with the move from the Fireball straight-eight to the more compact Fireball V8 engine, the Roadmaster and Super four-door Riviera sedans became the same length.

In the middle of the 1955 model year, Buick and Oldsmobile introduced the world's first mass-produced four-door hardtops, with Buick offering it only on the Century and Special models, and the Riviera designation was also applied to these body styles. Four-door Riviera hardtops were added to the Roadmaster and Super lines at the beginning of the following model year. However, since it was a body style designation and not a model, the Riviera name does not usually appear on the car.

In 1959, Buick became much more selective in applying the Riviera name. From then until 1962 it only was used to denote a premium trimmed six-window hardtop style which it initially shared exclusively with Cadillac (the Oldsmobile 98 would receive it in 1961) and was available only on the Electra 225. The last usage of the term Riviera to describe a luxury trim level was 1963, as the formal designation of the #4829 Electra 225 Riviera four-door hardtop, the same year the E-body model two-door hardtop coupe Riviera made its debut.

=== Debut as a personal luxury car ===
1963 Buick Silver Arrow concept car

In the late 1950s, GM lacked a personal luxury car to compete with the highly successful Ford Thunderbird—a uniquely styled, two-door that had dramatically increased in popularity when expanded from a two-seater to a four-passenger car— and the Chrysler 300C. To fill this gap, an experimental Cadillac design, the XP-715, was created, dubbed the "LaSalle" after a former GM luxury marque. Its angular look was reportedly inspired by GM styling chief Bill Mitchell's visit to London during the period, when he was struck by the sight of a custom-bodied Rolls-Royce. He later said that "knife-edged" styling was what he wanted for the new model, but with a lower profile. The design itself was penned by stylist Ned Nickles.

When Cadillac passed on the venture in 1960 the project was thrown open for competition by the other GM Divisions. Buick, desperate to revive its flagging sales, won the competition by enlisting the aid of the McCann-Erickson advertising agency to create its presentation. Initially referred to as the "Buick LaSalle" and later "Buick Riviera" concept cars, the finished design was adapted to a shortened version of Buick's existing cruciform frame. It was again introduced as a concept car in 1963 called the Buick Riviera Silver Arrow.

Of the first generation Riviera, 112,544 units were produced in three years, divided into exactly 40,000 vehicles in the 1963 model year, as well as 37,658 for 1964 and the last model year 1965 with 34,586 vehicles.

== First generation (1963–1965) ==
First generation

Overview
- Model years: 1963–1965
- Assembly: Buick City, Flint, Michigan
- Designer: Bill Mitchell

Body and chassis
- Body style: 2-door hardtop
- Layout: FR layout
- Platform: E-body

Powertrain
- Engine: 401 cu in (6.6 L) Nailhead V8; 425 cu in (7.0 L) Nailhead V8
- Transmission: Twin Turbine Dynaflow automatic (1963); 3-speed TH-400 automatic (1964-1965)

Dimensions
- Wheelbase: 117.0 in (2,972 mm)
- Length: 208.0 in (5,283 mm)
- Width: 76.3 in (1,938 mm)–76.6 in (1,946 mm)
- Height: 53.0 in (1,346 mm)

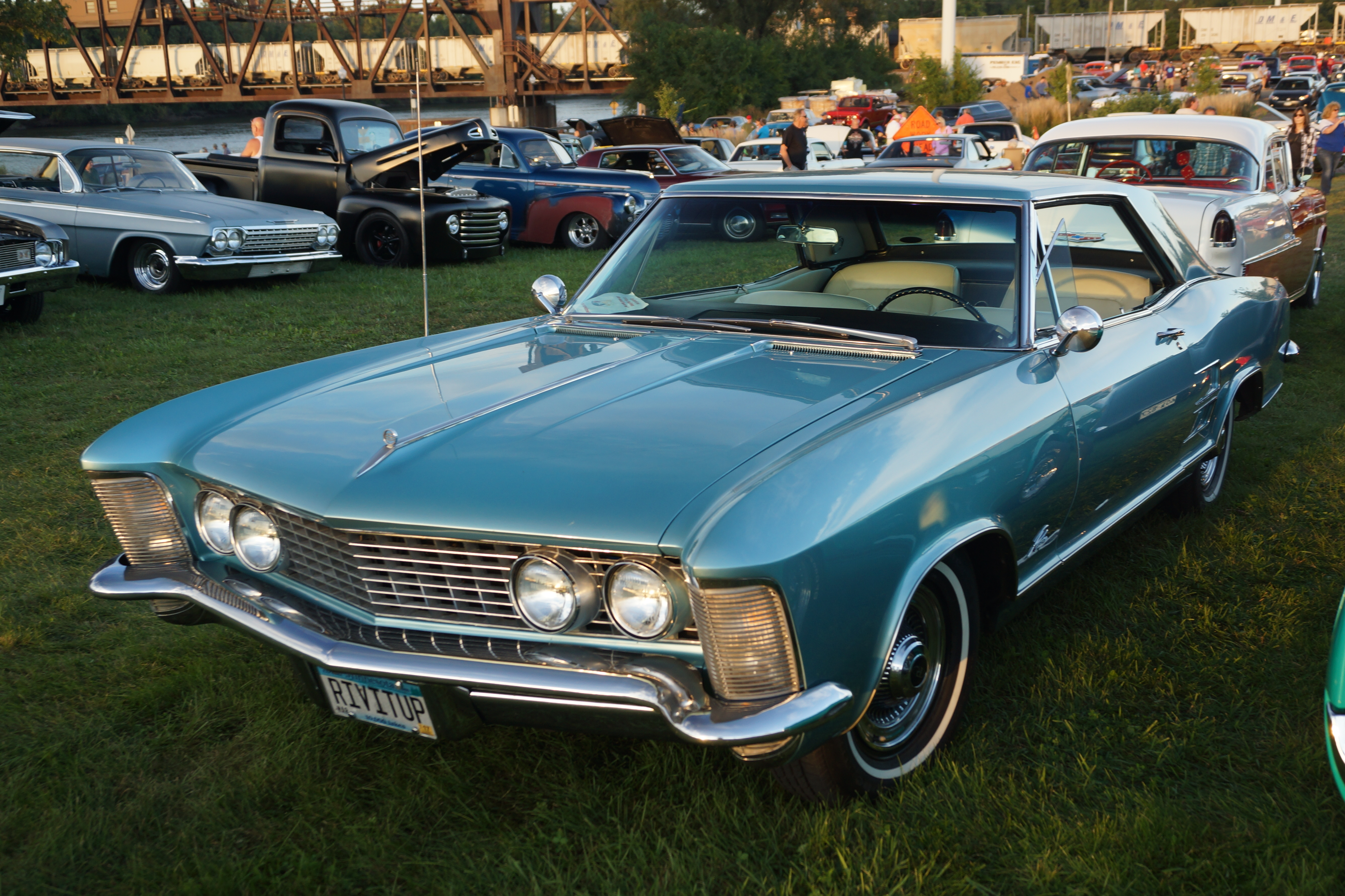
1964 Buick Riviera

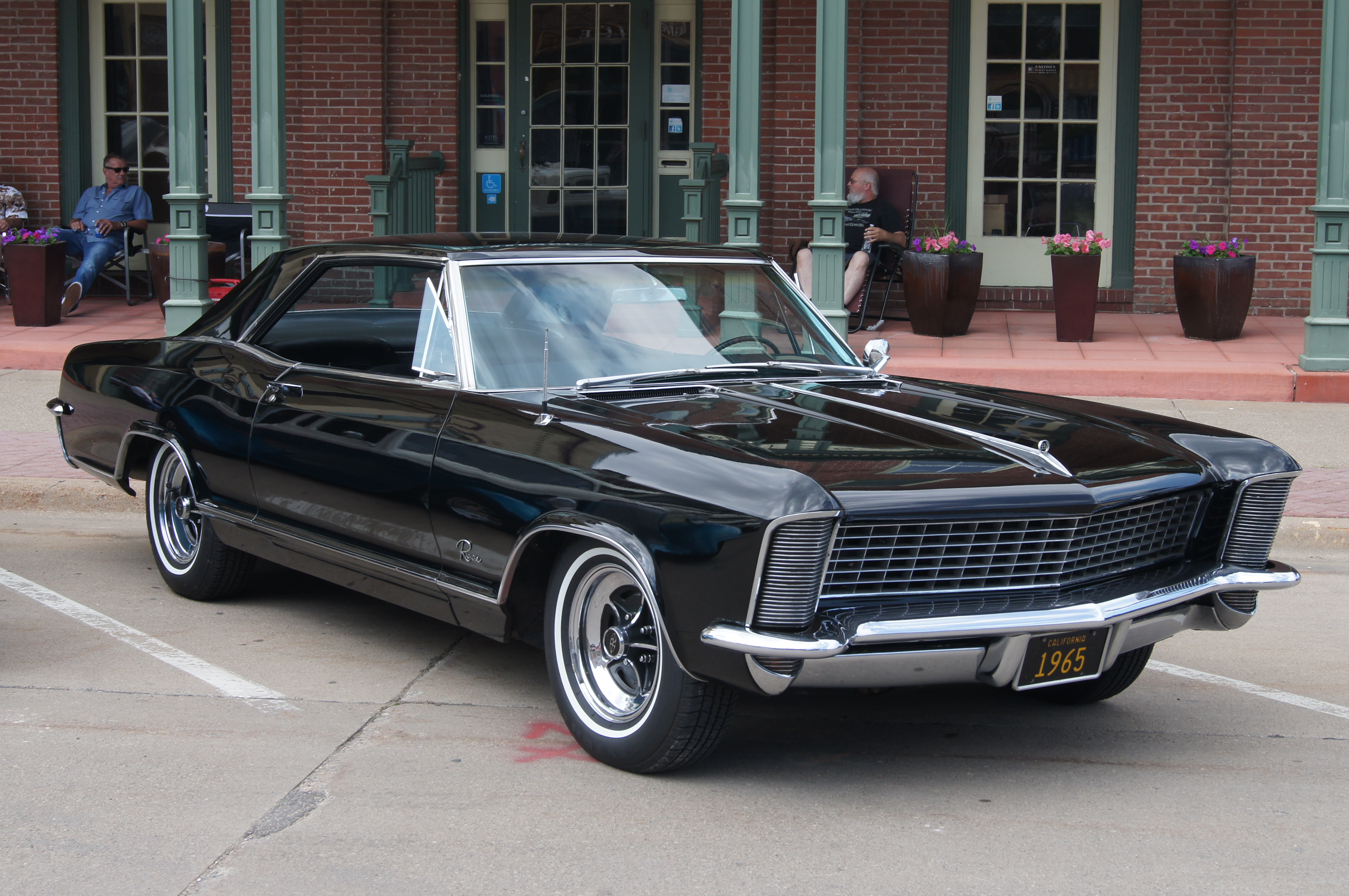
1965 Buick Riviera

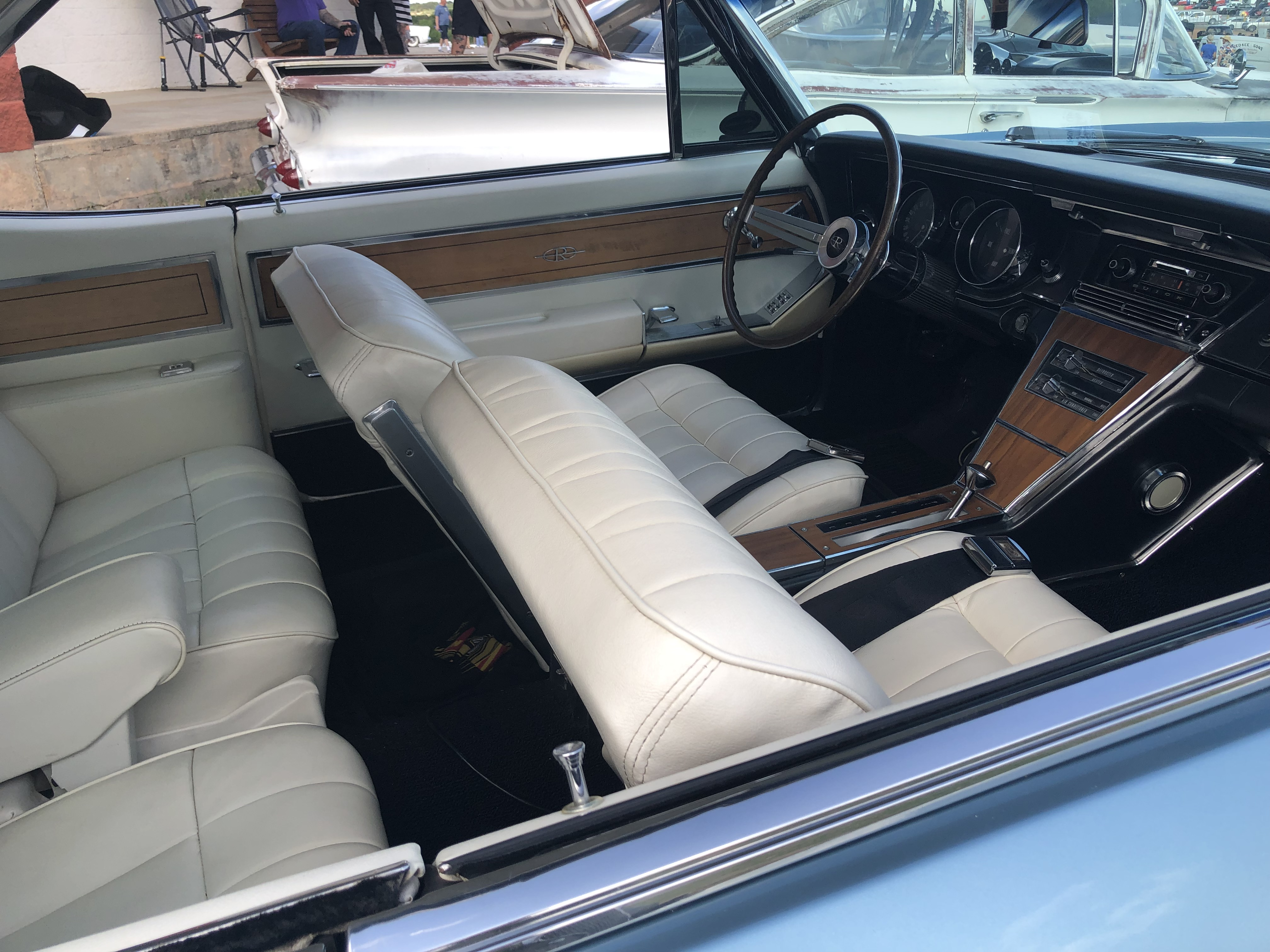
Interior

The production Riviera was introduced on October 4, 1962, as a 1963 model. Its bodyshell was unique to the marque, unusual for a GM product. The design was substantially the same as the original, less expensively hidden headlights concealed in the fender grilles. The elegant ground-up styling sported the new "Coke bottle look" introduced the year before on the arresting Studebaker Avanti, with a tapered midsection surrounded by flaring fenders. There was no trace of the "Sweepspear" used on beltlines of earlier Buicks with the Riviera package.

It rode on a cruciform frame similar to the standard Buick chassis, but shorter and narrower, with a 2 in (51 mm) narrower track. Its wheelbase of 117.0 inches (2,970 mm) and overall length of 208.0 inches (5,280 mm) were 6.0 in (150 mm) and 7.7 in (200 mm) shorter, respectively, than a Buick LeSabre, but slightly longer than a contemporary Thunderbird. At 3,998 pounds (1,813 kg), it was about 390 lb (180 kg) lighter than either. It shared the standard Buick V8 engines, with a displacement of either 401 cu in (6.6 L) or 425 cu in (7.0 L), and the unique continuously variable design twin turbine automatic transmission. Power brakes were standard, using Buick's massive "Al-Fin" (aluminum finned) drums of 12.0 in (300 mm) diameter. Power steering was standard equipment, with an overall steering ratio of 20.5:1, giving 3.5 turns lock-to-lock.

The Riviera's suspension used Buick's standard design, with double wishbones in the front and a live axle located by trailing arms and a lateral track bar in the rear, but the roll centers were lowered to reduce body lean. Although its coil springs were actually slightly softer than other Buicks, the Riviera's lighter weight made its ride somewhat firmer. While still biased towards understeer, contemporary testers considered it one of the most driveable American cars, with an excellent balance of comfort and agility.

Buick's 325 hp (242 kW) 401 cu in (6.6 L) "Nailhead" V-8 was initially the only available engine, fitted with dual exhaust as standard equipment, and the turbine drive the only transmission. Base price was $4,333 ($46,119 in 2025 dollars), running upwards of $5,000 delivered with typical options ($53,218 in 2025 dollars). Buick announced an optional 340 hp (254 kW) 425 cu in (7.0 L) version of the Nailhead in December 1962. Total production was deliberately limited to 40,000 vehicles (in a year that Buick sold 440,000 units overall) to emphasize the Riviera's exclusivity and to increase demand; only 2,601 were delivered with the delayed availability larger engine in the 1963 model year.

With the same power as the bigger Buicks and less weight, the Riviera had improved all-around performance: Motor Trend recorded 0–60 miles per hour (0–97 km/h) in 8 seconds or less, the standing 1/4 mile (400 m) in about 16 seconds, and an observed top speed of 115 miles per hour (185 km/h). Fuel economy was 13.2 mpg_{‑US} (17.8 L/100 km; 15.9 mpg_{‑imp}). Front leg room was 40.1 inches (1,019 mm).

Inside, the Riviera featured a luxurious four-place cabin with front bucket seats and bucket-style seats in the rear. A center console with a floor shifter and storage compartment built into the instrument panel divided the front. Upholstery choices included all-vinyl, cloth and vinyl, or optional leather. A deluxe interior option included real walnut inserts on the doors and below the rear side windows. Extra-cost options included a tilt steering wheel, power windows, power driver's seat, air conditioning, a remote-controlled side-view mirror, and white sidewall tires.

Minimal trim and mechanical changes were made for 1964, with the most identifiable distinguishing features being a raised stylized "R" hood emblem and "R" emblems replacing the Buick crests in the taillight lenses. The interior is distinguished by moving the heater controls from controls under the dashboard eyebrow to slide controls in the forward fairing of the center console. Leather was dropped as an option, and the Dynaflow twin-turbine transmission was replaced by a new three-speed Super Turbine 400. This was a GM Turbo Hydra-Matic. It used a two-speed "D" and 'L" selector, but could automatically downshift from third to second until the car reached a suitable speed to downshift to first. This was the first year of the stylized "R" emblem, a trademark that would continue throughout the remainder of Riviera's 36-year production run. The engine was upgraded to the previously optional 340 hp (254 kW) 425 cu in (7.0 L) V8. A 360 hp (268 kW) 'Super Wildcat' version was available, with dual Carter AFB four-barrel carburetors.

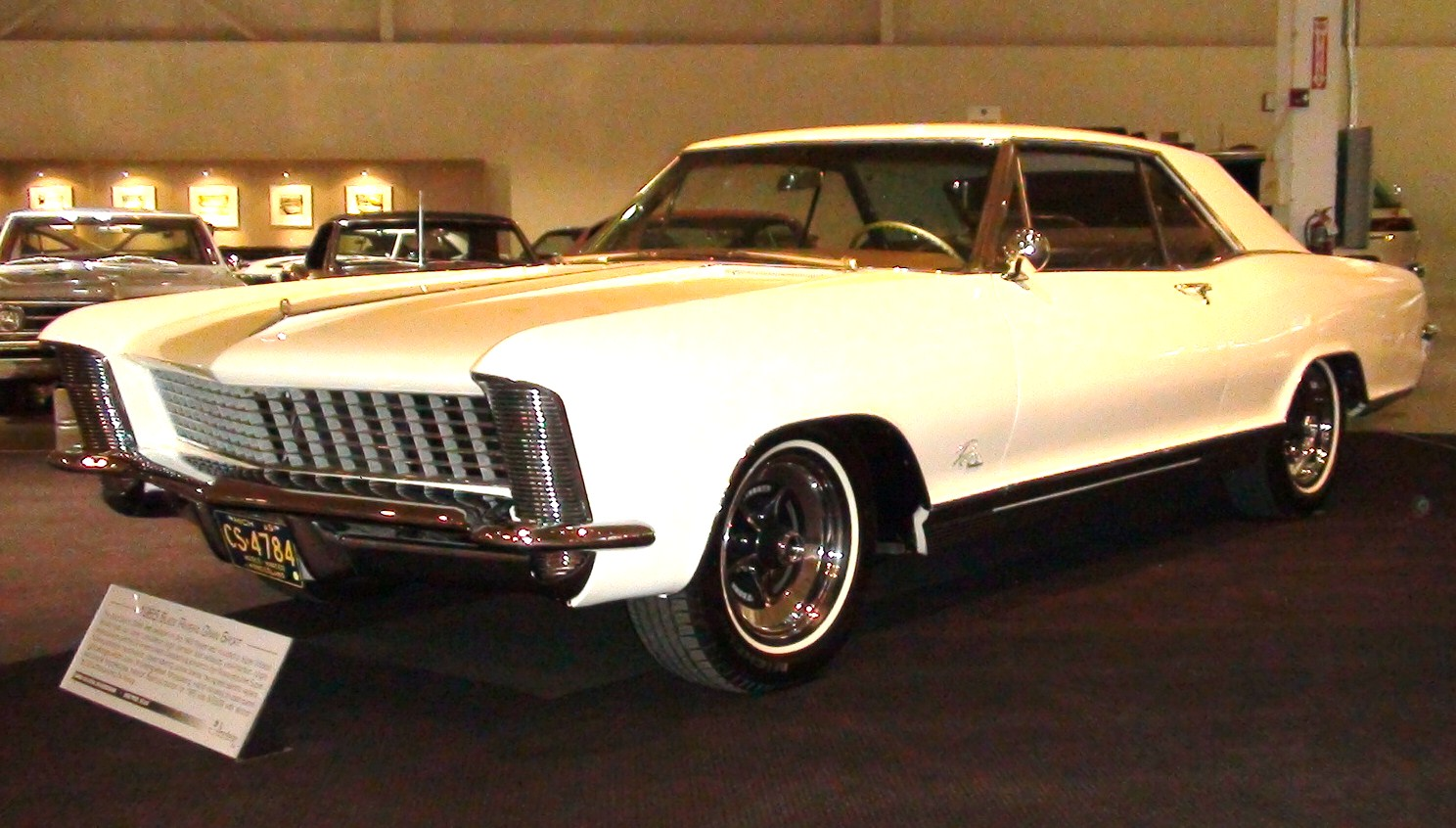
1965 Buick Riviera GS

In 1965 the 401 cu in (6.6 L) V8 returned as the standard engine, and the "Gran Sport" version made its debut, powered by the Super Wildcat V8, a 360 hp (268 kW) engine equipped with two Carter 625 CFM carburetors, a distributor with different advance, and outfitted with a more aggressive 3.42 axle ratio. A heavy-duty suspension was the separate H2 option but was not part of the Gran Sport option. It offered a quicker ratio steering box and firmer rated springs. The Super Turbine 400 transmission now had a variable pitch torque converter, but was fitted with a three-speed gear selector. The Gran Sport stock dual exhaust pipes were increased from 2.0 inches (51 mm) to 2.25 inches (57 mm) inside diameter and had fewer turns to reduce backpressure. Externally, the headlamps, now vertically arranged, were hidden behind clamshell doors in the leading edges of each fender, as had been in the original design. The non-functional side scoops between the doors and rear wheel arches were removed, and the taillights moved from the body into the rear bumper. A vinyl roof became available as an option, offered only in black, and the tilt steering wheel, optional in previous years, was now standard equipment.

Total sales for the 1963 through 1965 model years was 112,244. The Riviera was well received by the motoring press and considered a great success, giving the Thunderbird its first real competition as America's preeminent personal luxury car.

It has since earned Milestone status from the Milestone Car Society. Jaguar founder and designer Sir William Lyons remarked that Mitchell had done "a very wonderful job," and Sergio Pininfarina declared it "one of the most beautiful American cars ever built; it has marked a very impressive return to simplicity of American car design." At its debut at the Paris Auto Show, Raymond Loewy said the Riviera was the most handsome American production car—apart from his own Studebaker Avanti, in his view the Riviera's only real competition for 1963. The first-generation Riviera is considered a styling landmark and has become a collectible car.

Buick Riviera Production Figures
	Yearly Total
1963	40,000
1964	37,958
1965	34,586

== Second generation (1966–1970) ==
Second generation
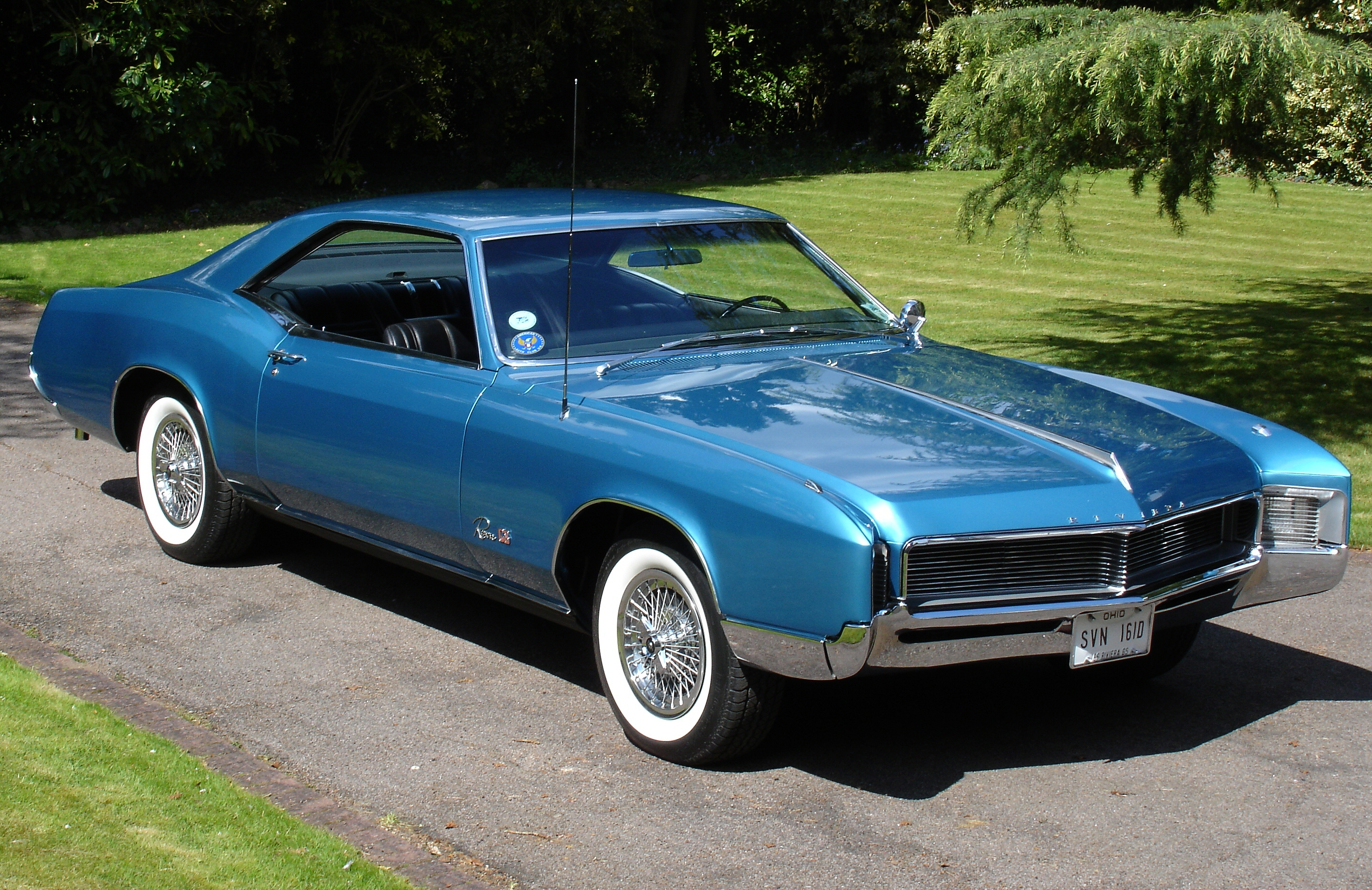
- 1966 Buick Riviera GS

Overview
- Model years: 1966–1970
- Assembly: Flint, Michigan (Buick City)
- Designer: Dave Holls

Body and chassis
- Body style: 2-door hardtop
- Layout: FR layout
- Platform: E-body
- Related: Cadillac Eldorado; Oldsmobile Toronado

Powertrain
- Engine: 425 cu in (7.0 L) Nailhead V8; 430 cu in (7.0 L) Buick V8; 455 cu in (7.5 L) Buick V8
- Transmission: 3-speed TH-400 automatic

Dimensions
- Wheelbase: 119.0 in (3,023 mm)
- Length: 211.2 in (5,364 mm) (1966–67); 215.2 in (5,466 mm) (1968–1970)
- Width: 78.8 in (2,002 mm); 79.3 in (2,014 mm) (1970)
- Height: 53.2–53.6 in (1,351–1,361 mm)

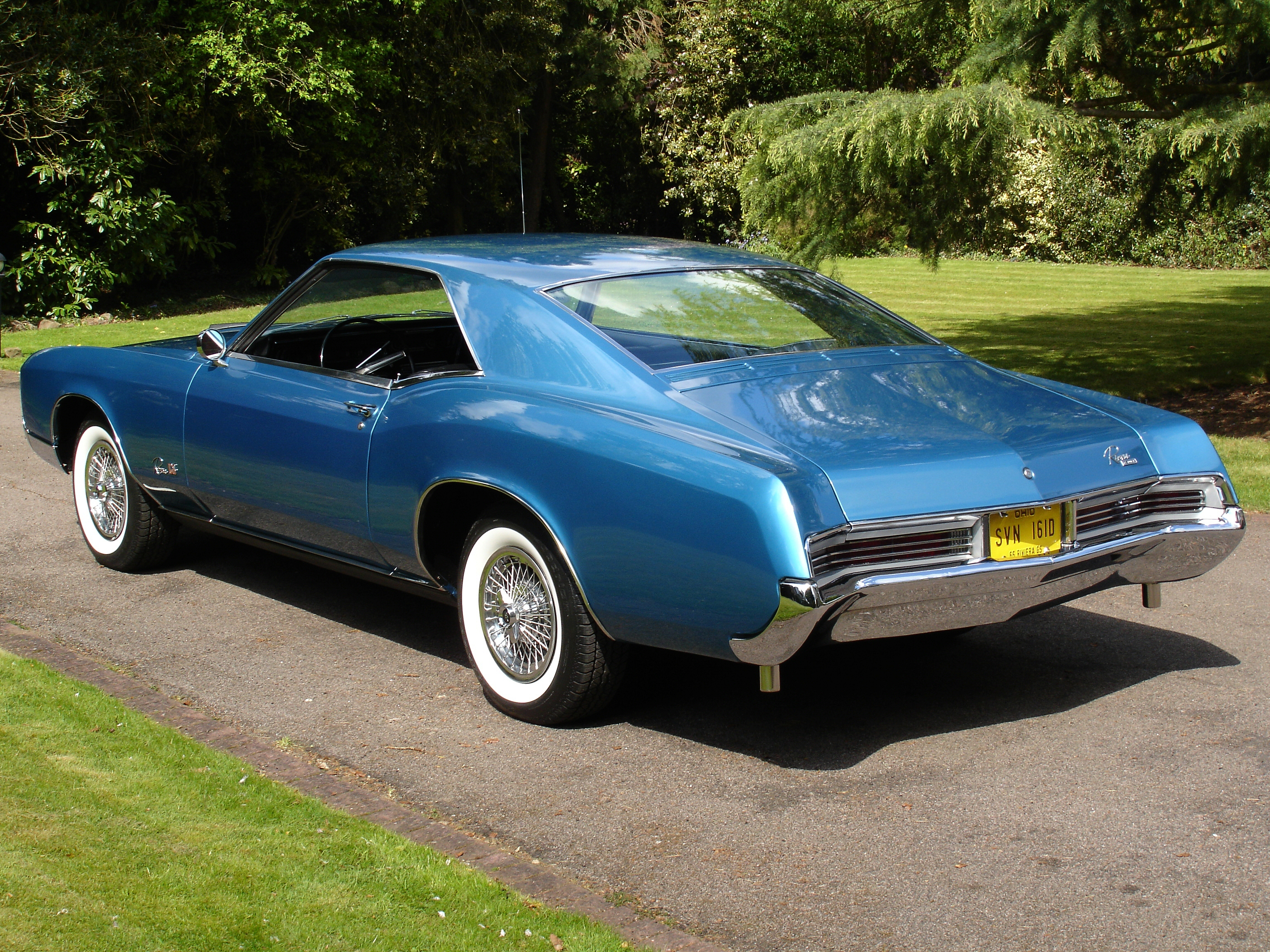
1966 Buick Riviera GS rear

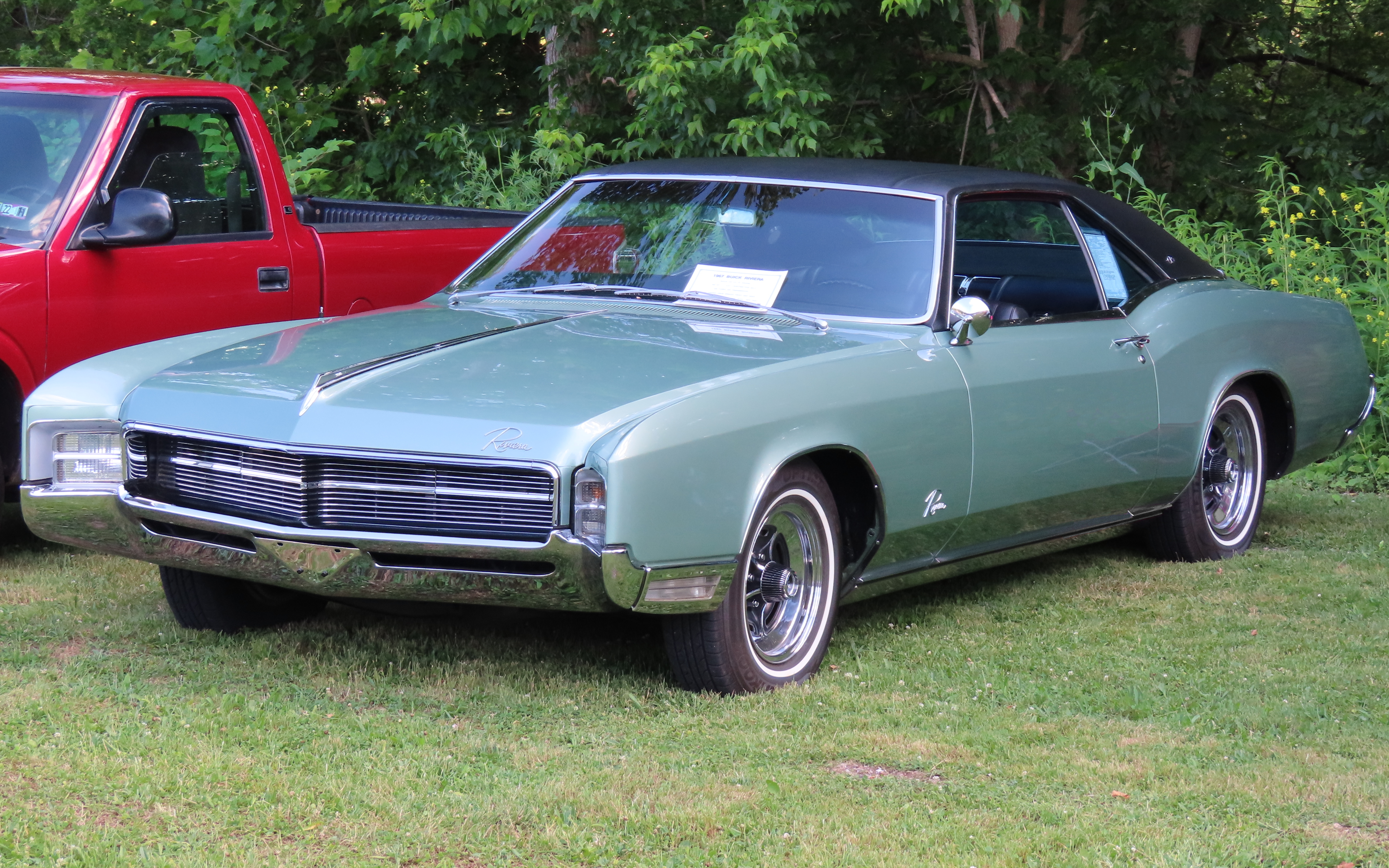
1967 Buick Riviera

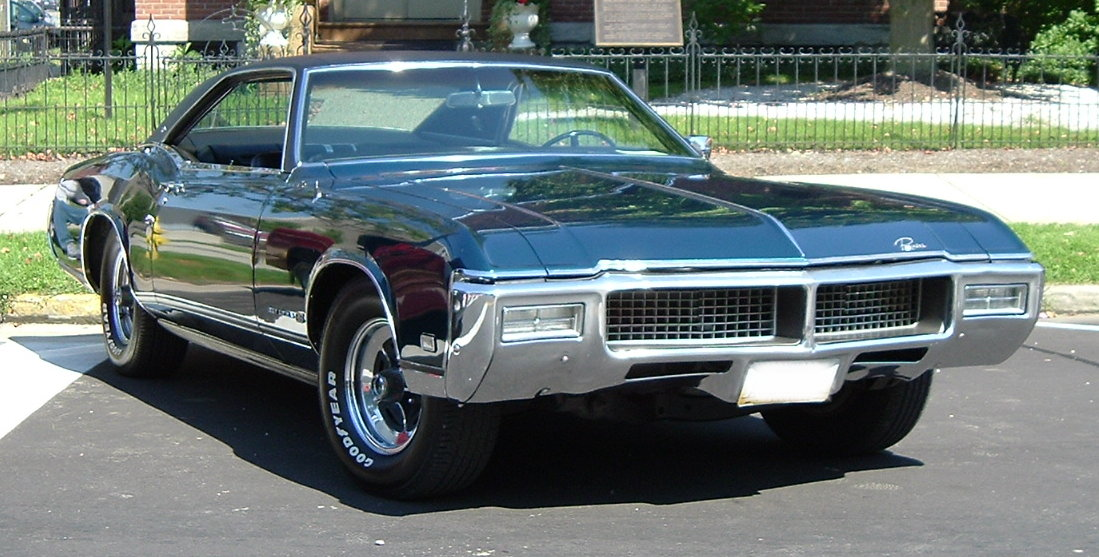
1968 Buick Riviera GS

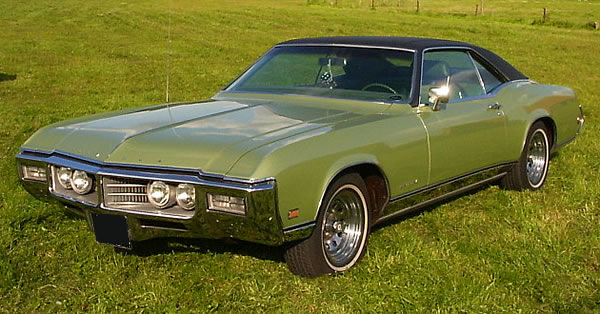
1969 model (headlights deployed)

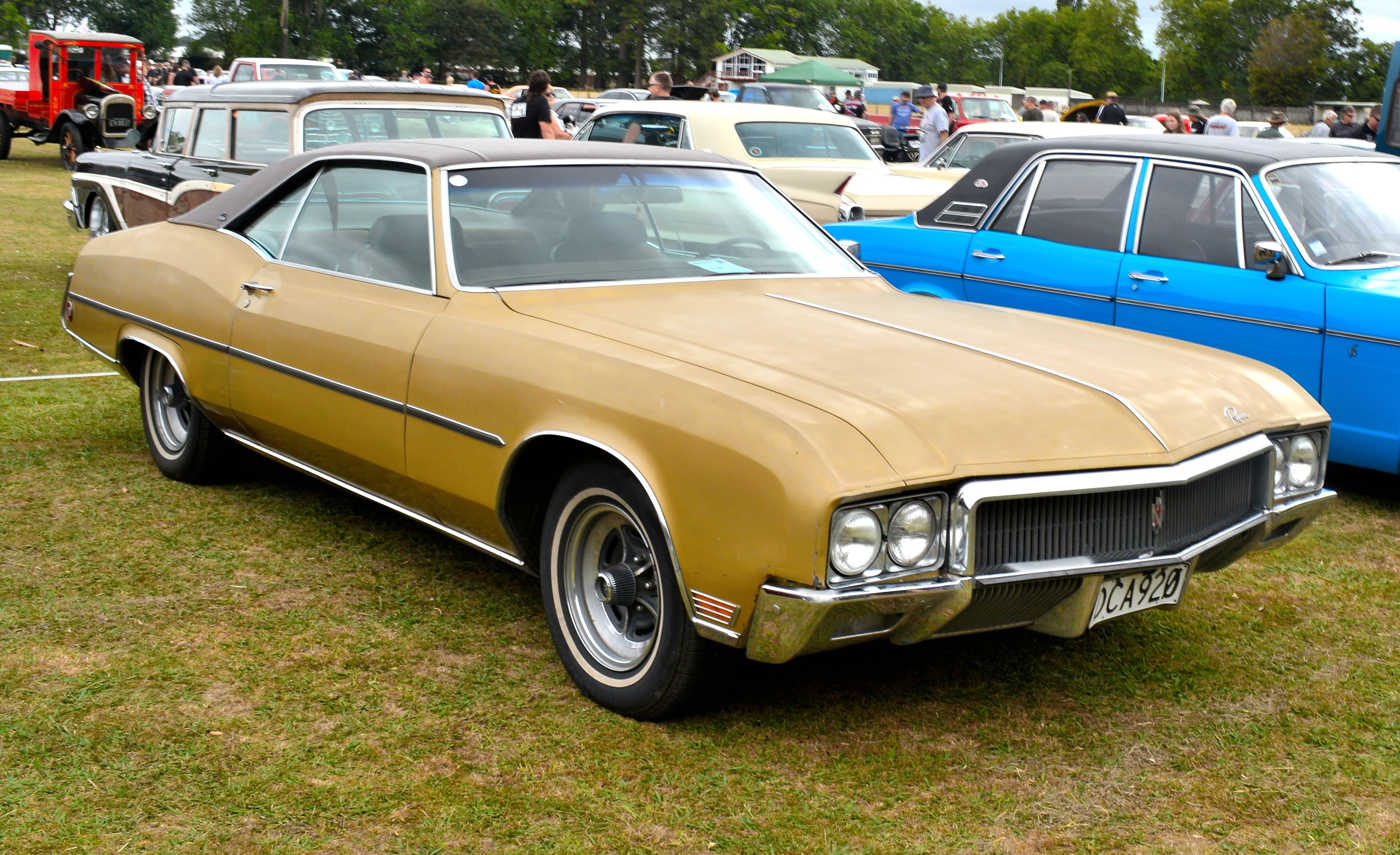
1970 Buick Riviera

The Riviera was redesigned for the 1966 model year. It retained its cruciform X-frame, powertrain, and brakes, but its new body was longer, wider, and 200 pounds (91 kg) heavier. Vent windows, a feature GM had introduced in the 1930s, were absent. Headlamps remained concealed, but now pivoted behind the grille when not in use, and they were once again horizontal. The car's added weight slowed acceleration with the unchanged 425 engine. The Gran Sport package remained available as an option. Rear seat belts and AM/FM radio were optional.

The new front-wheel drive Oldsmobile Toronado shared the Riviera platform, and, a year later, the also front-wheel drive Cadillac Eldorado — the Riviera retaining the rear-wheel drive layout.

Inside, the four-place cabin with front and rear bucket seats and center console were replaced by a choice of bucket seats or conventional bench seats as standard equipment, making the Riviera a full six-passenger car for the first time. Optionally available was a Strato-bench seat with armrest or Strato bucket seats with either a short console or a full-length operating console with a horseshoe-shaped floor shifter and storage compartment. Both the buckets and Strato-bench seat were available with a reclining seat option for the passenger's side. Sales for 1966 rebounded to 45,308, a new record.

For 1967, Buick replaced the 425 "Nailhead" with a 430 cu in (7.0 L) V8. Its 360 hp (268 kW) and 475 lb⋅ft (644 N⋅m) of torque were a performance improvement. Gasoline mileage improved slightly, but remained low. Powerful disc brakes with Bendix four-piston calipers became optional for the front wheels but most Riviera continued to be ordered with Buick's highly capable ribbed aluminum brake drums. Cosmetically, changes were few and were limited to the addition of a wide, full-width, center-mounted horizontal chrome grille bar that stretched over the headlight doors and outboard parking lights. Sales were 42,799 for the 1967 model year. The Riviera had full instrumentation.

1967 saw the introduction of U.S. mandated safety equipment to improve occupant crash protection, including an energy-absorbing steering column, non-protruding control knobs, 4-way hazard flasher, soft interior surfaces, locking seatbacks (on 2-door models), a dual-circuit hydraulic braking system (with warning light), and shoulder belt anchors.

1968 models had reshaped loop-type bumpers that surrounded both the vehicle's recessed crosshatch front grille and tail lamps. Hidden wiper arms debuted. Federally mandated side marker lights appeared, as inverted trapezoids on the lower leading edges of the front fenders, and circular in the rear. The interior was restyled and for the first time shared its instrument panel with the other full-size Buick models. Shoulder belts for front outboard occupants were made standard on all cars built from January 1, 1968. Mechanically, the transmission lost its variable pitch torque converter. A tilt steering wheel was standard. Sales set another new record in 1968, as 49,284 units were sold.

For the 1969 model year, grilles gained a pattern of fine vertical bars overlaid by two wider horizontal bars. Front marker lights became far shorter and square. Front outboard headrests were revised. The ignition switch was moved from the instrument panel to the steering column and locked the steering wheel and selector lever when the key was removed (a security feature that became mandatory for the 1970 model year). Chrome side trim was revised, as well. At the rear, the reverse lights moved from the rear bumper to new three-section tail-light lenses. Sales for 1969 were 52,872.

The 1970 Riviera was restyled, incorporating design cues from Bill Mitchell's 1968 "Silver Arrow II" concept car. Exposed quad headlamps were nearly flush-mounted, while the new front bumper wrapped around and over the new vertical bar grille. A pronounced side trim and skirted rear wheels were standard, with optional exposed wheels. The rear used revised bumper and taillights. The engine was upgraded to 455 cu in (7.5 L), the largest engine Buick offered to date, rated at 370 hp (276 kW) gross, 245 hp (183 kW) net, and over 500 lb⋅ft (680 N⋅m) of torque. 1970 sales were 37,366. The second-generation Riviera proved more successful than the first, with 227,669 units sold over the five years it was built.

== Third generation (1971–1973) ==
Third generation
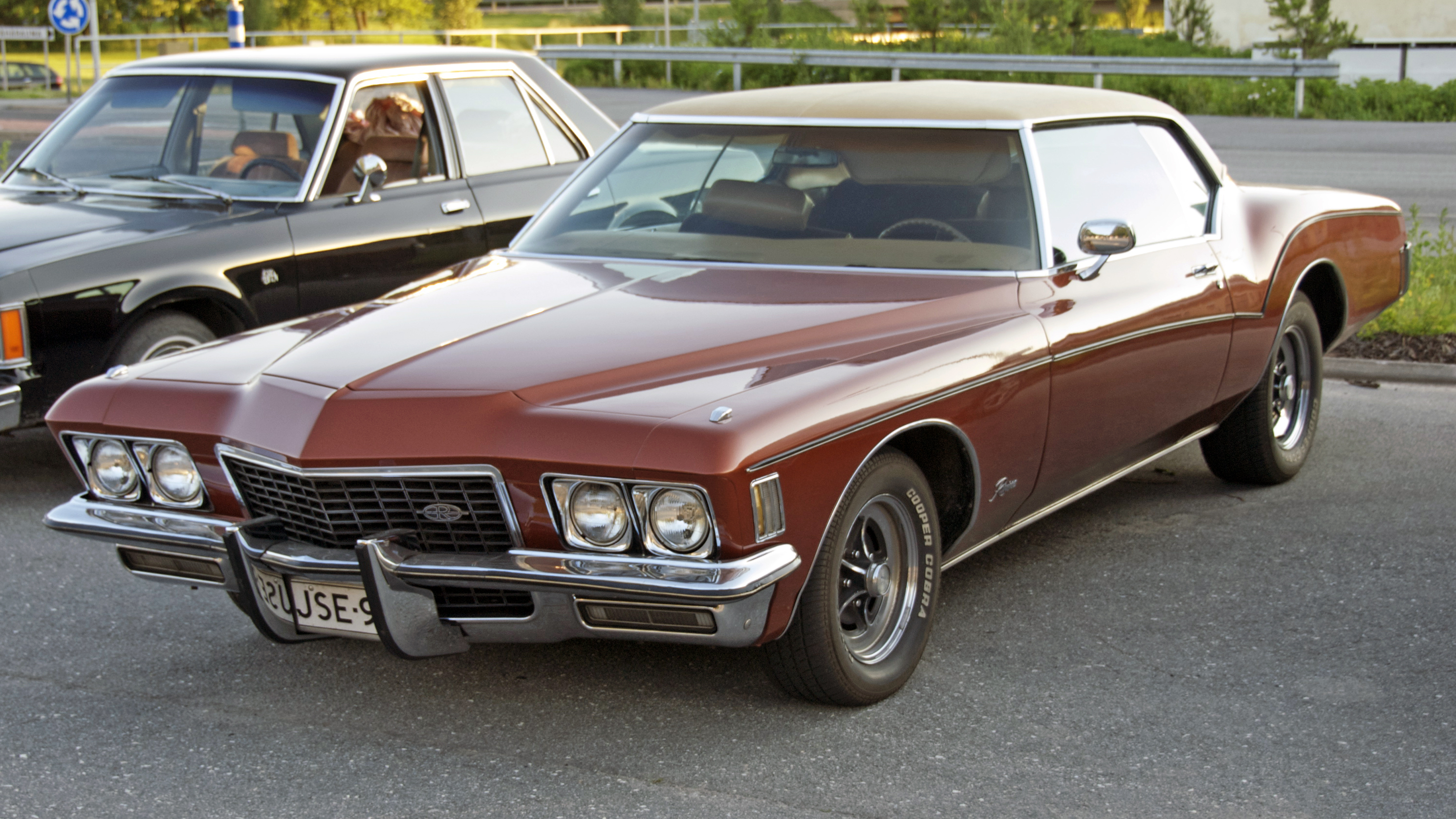
- 1972 Buick Riviera

Overview
- Model years: 1971–1973
- Assembly: Flint, Michigan, United States (Buick City)
- Designer: Jerry Hirshberg under Bill Mitchell

Body and chassis
- Body style: 2-door hardtop
- Layout: FR layout
- Platform: E-body
- Related: Cadillac Eldorado; Oldsmobile Toronado

Powertrain
- Engine: 455 cu in (7.5 L) Buick V8
- Transmission: 3-speed TH-400 automatic

Dimensions
- Wheelbase: 122.0 in (3,099 mm)
- Length: 217.4 in (5,522 mm) (1971); 218.3 in (5,545 mm) (1972); 223.4 in (5,674 mm) (1973)
- Width: 79.9 in (2,029 mm)
- Height: 54.0 in (1,372 mm)
- Curb weight: 4,247 lb (1,926 kg)

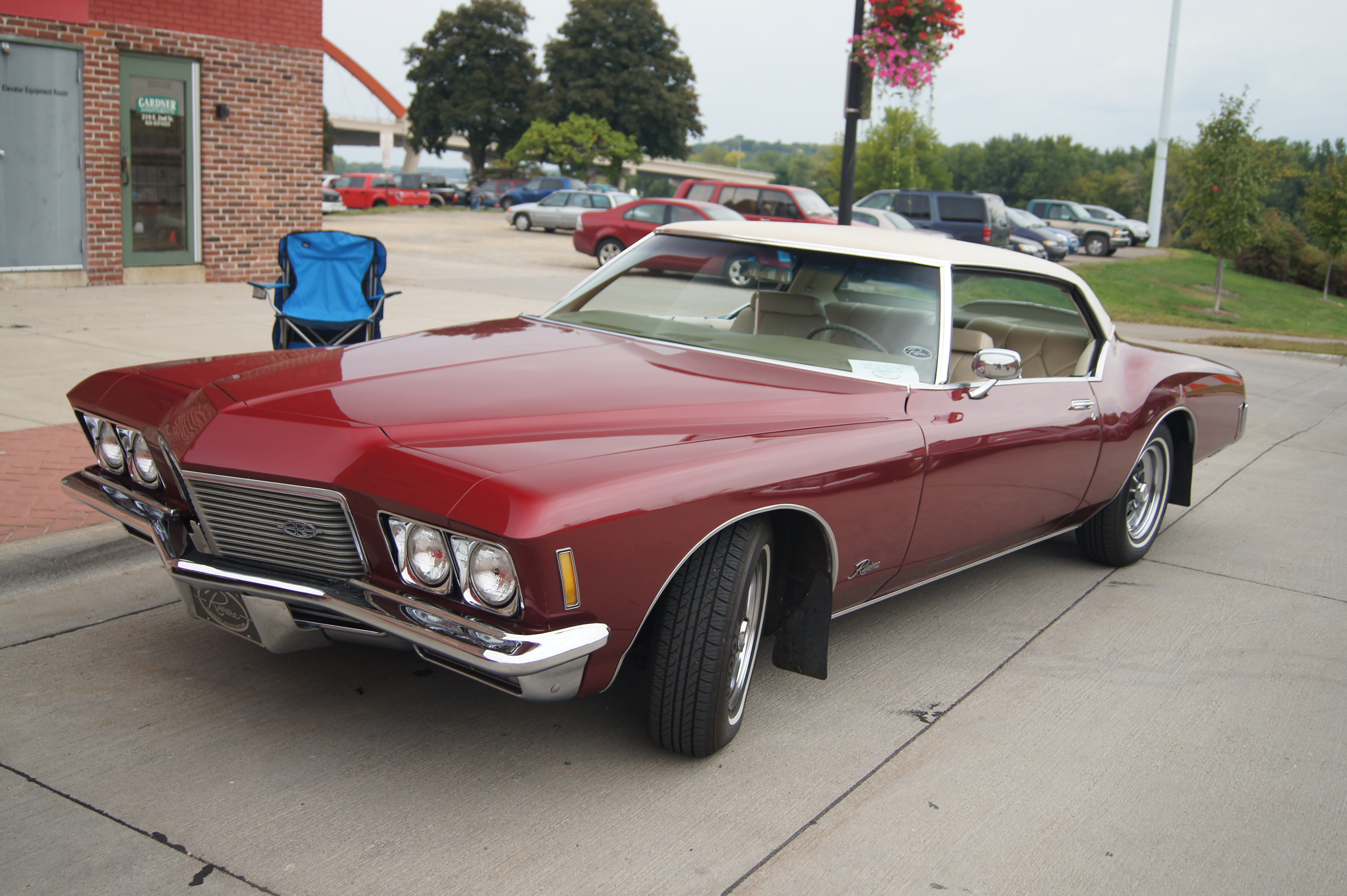
1971 Buick Riviera

1972 Buick Riviera rear

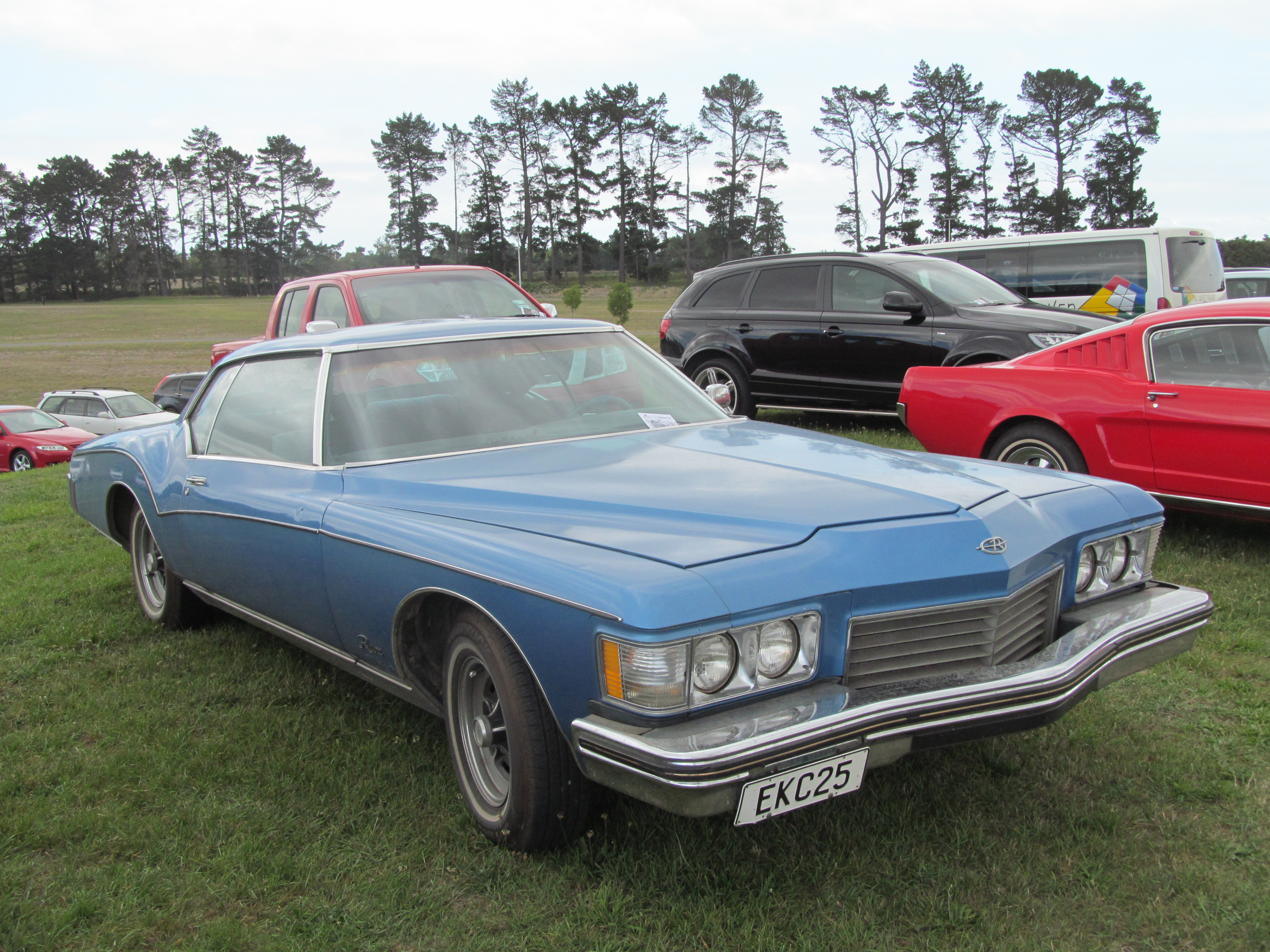
1973 Buick Riviera

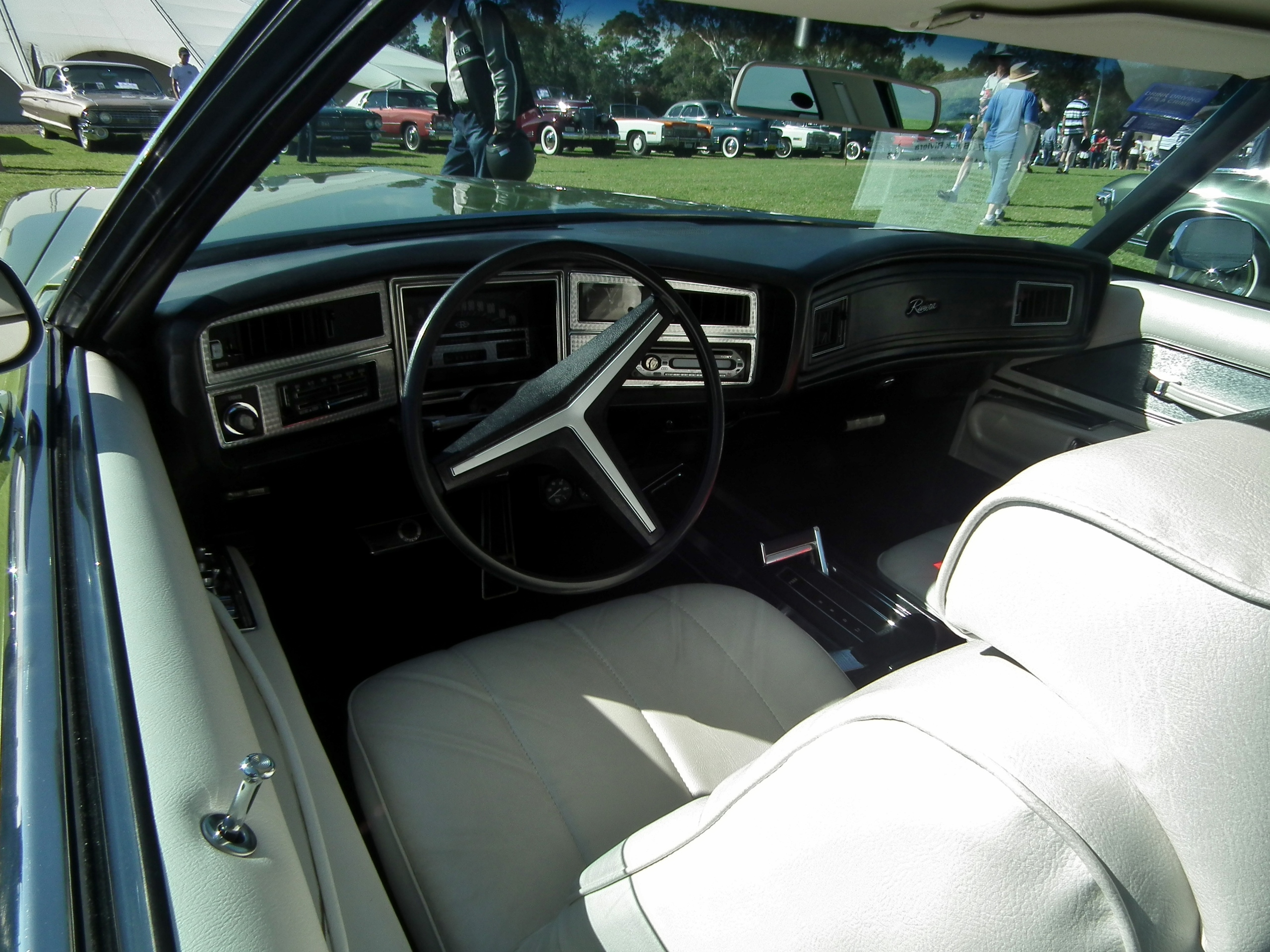
1971 Buick Riviera interior

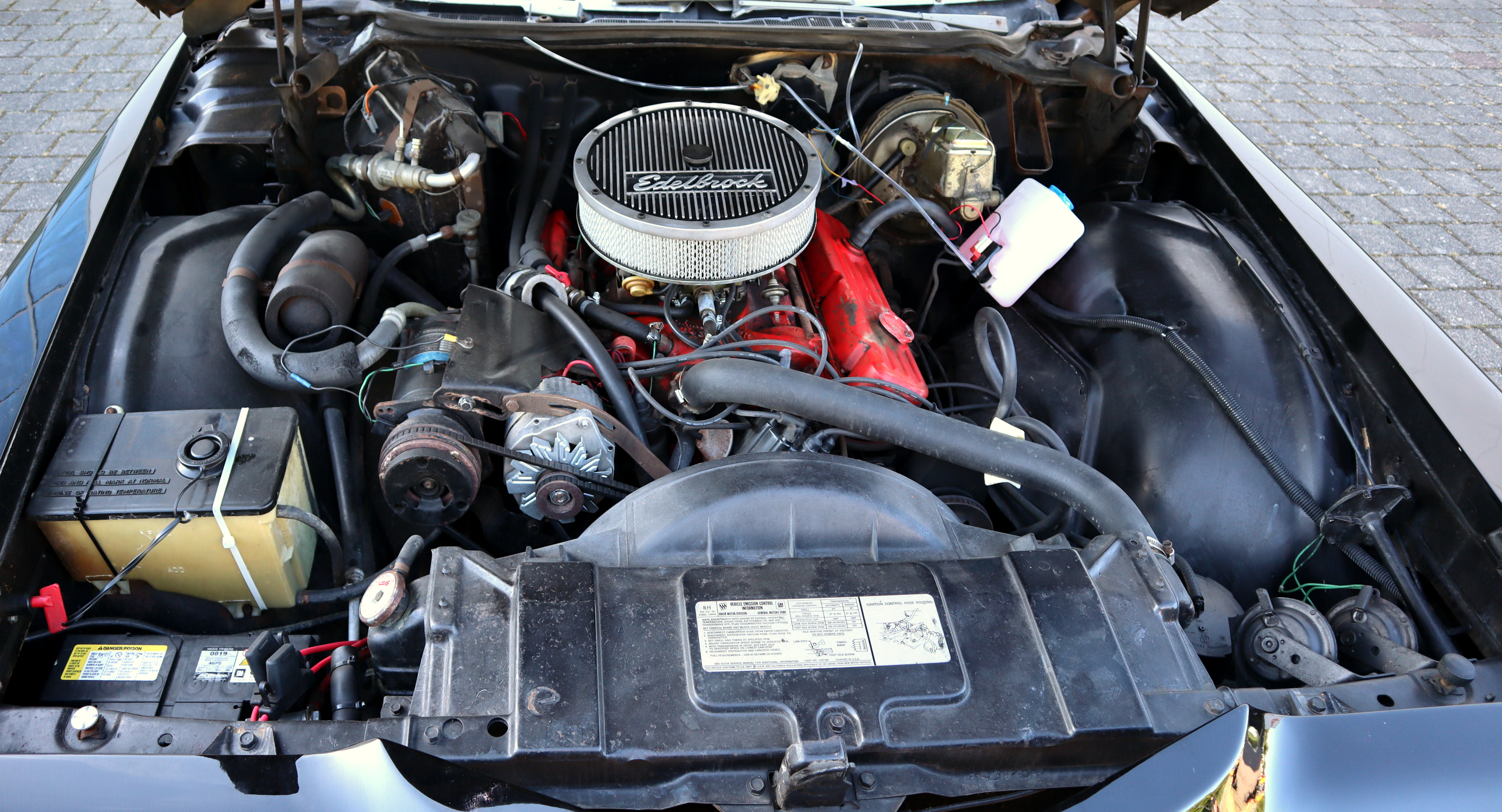
V8 engine of a 1971 Buick Riviera

The Riviera was radically redesigned for the 1971 model year with flowing and dramatic "boat-tail" styling. Designed under Bill Mitchell's direction, it was penned by Jerry Hirshberg, future head of design for Nissan, mating the two-piece vee-butted fastback rear window, inspired by the 1963 Corvette Sting Ray coupe, to the Riviera's platform.

The design was originally intended for the smaller A-body or its related G-body, as shown by a full scale clay model of an A-body based boat-tail Riviera recently revealed. Given the late stage of the 1968-72 A/G platform evolution and accretive cost to add another version to it, GM Management decreed that the next Riviera use the full sized GM B platform body—expanded for 1971 by 3 in (76 mm) in wheelbase and more than 120 lb (54 kg) heavier— which produced controversial looks, making for a sharp departure from those of the Toronado and Eldorado. (Collectible Automobile ran an article about 1971–76 full-sized Buicks in which one sketch design for their 2-door coupes which was rejected resembled the 1971–73 Riviera).

This generation introduced a much more visual representation of the "sweepspear", with a more faithful representation to the version that appeared on 1950s Buicks in both the side molding and beltline. Large, round wheel openings were intended to convey more of a sporty air. The only engine available was Buick's own 455 ci V8 engine producing 315 hp (235 kW), with 330 hp (246 kW) with the Gran Sport (GS) package.

The 455 engine had a lower compression ratio to meet EPA emissions requirements, together with the shift from SAE gross to SAE net ratings this reduced claimed power to 255 hp (190 kW), with 265 hp (198 kW) in the Gran Sport. Performance remained reasonably brisk, with a 0–60 mph time of 8.1 seconds for the GS, but the Riviera's sporty image was rapidly fading. One noteworthy advance was Buick's Max Trac traction control. The 1971 Riviera also features GM's "Full-Flo" ventilation system and two large deck lid louvers are prominent on the trunk lid.

Despite these features, Riviera sales for 1971 dropped to 33,810, the lowest to date. The 1972 Riviera received a new, egg-crate grille, more substantial front bumpers to prepare for the new 5-mph impact legislation, restyled taillight trim, and the louvers were removed from the trunk lid. The 1972 Riviera also featured a redesigned ventilation system, and the 455 engine switched to net power ratings, 225 hp (168 kW) or 250 hp (186 kW) in the Gran Sport, although the actual drop in net power was only 5 hp (4 kW). Sales remained stagnant at 33,728, a drop of 82 from the prior year.

For 1973, the Riviera underwent a number of changes. The front bumper was redesigned to be thicker and featured bumper guards as standard in order to meet 1974 impact-bumper standards, the grille was switched back to horizontal slats, and the front lamps were moved from the bumper and were now integrated into the headlights, wrapping around the corners of the car. Sluggish sales of the third generation Riviera led GM to believe that the boattail deck lid was too radical for most customers' tastes, so in 1973 it was blunted and made slightly shorter. The taillights, meanwhile, were moved down from the sheet metal and into the bumper, and the rear license plate location was moved from the left side of the bumper to the center. The 250 hp (186 kW) engine became standard, with 260 hp (194 kW) with the Stage One package. This also included a limited-slip differential and a chrome-plated air cleaner. The "Gran Sport" package was still available as a separate option package consisting of a ride-and-handling package that included a rear stabilizer bar, JR78-15 whitewall steel-belted radial tires, a specially tuned "radial roadability" suspension, additional sound insulation and special "Gran Sport" badging. The design changes however only led to a marginal increase in sales, with 34,080 being produced for the model year.

== Fourth generation (1974–1976) ==
Fourth generation
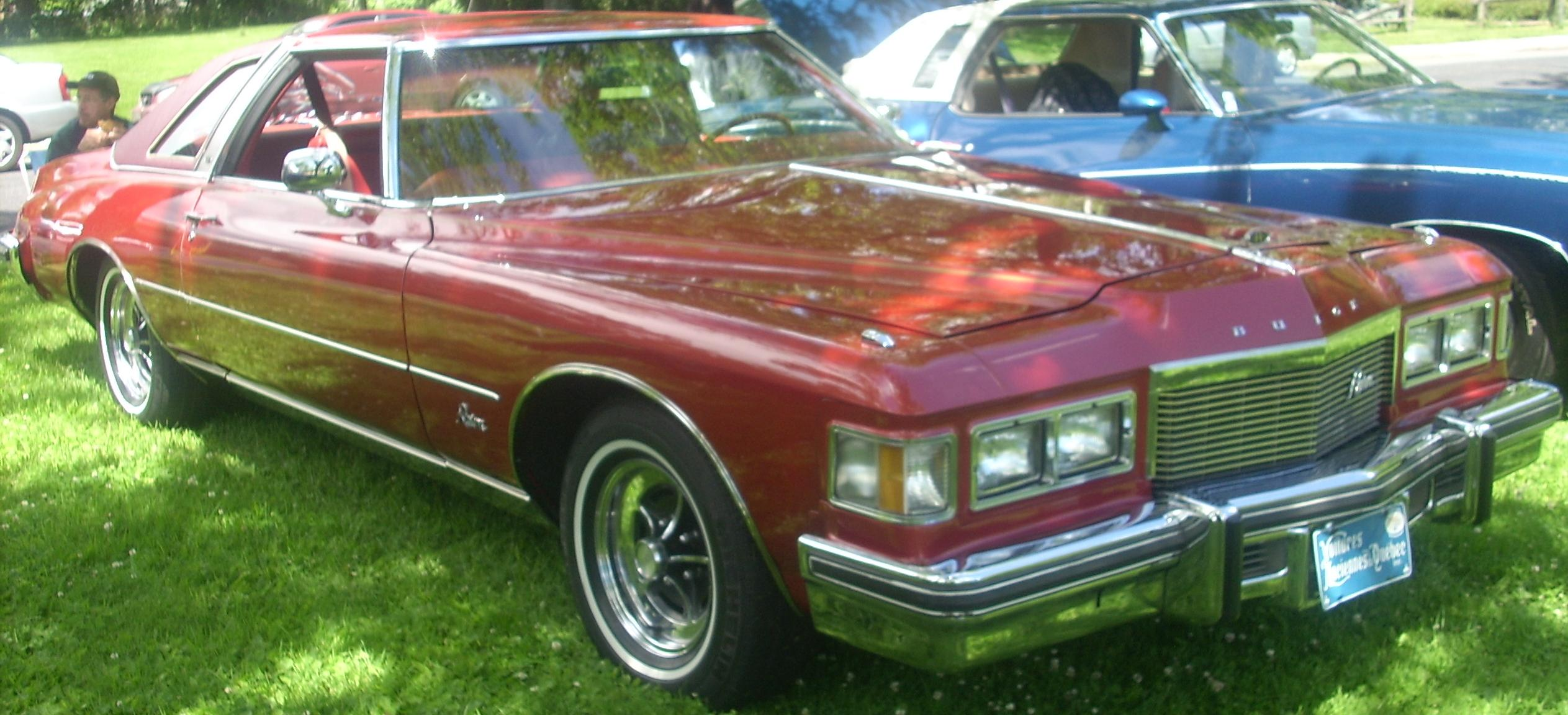
- 1976 Buick Riviera

Overview
- Model years: 1974–1976
- Assembly: Flint, Michigan, United States (Buick City)

Body and chassis
- Body style: 2-door coupe
- Layout: FR layout
- Platform: E-body
- Related: Cadillac Eldorado; Oldsmobile Toronado

Powertrain
- Engine: 455 cu in (7.5 L) Buick V8
- Transmission: 3-speed TH-400 automatic

Dimensions
- Wheelbase: 122.0 in (3,099 mm)
- Length: 226.4 in (5,751 mm) (1974); 223.0 in (5,664 mm) (1975)
- Width: 80.0 in (2,032 mm)
- Height: 54.0 in (1,372 mm)

Although carrying over the same platform, mechanicals, and some body panels seen on the "Third Generation" Riviera, Buick replaced its distinctive 'boat tail' roofline with a more conventional-looking "Colonnade" treatment which was more in line with its LeSabre and Electra brethren than its front-wheel drive cousins. This turned the car from a hardtop coupe into a pillared coupe, as it featured wide B pillars and fixed quarter opera windows. A landau half-vinyl roof option was available. The car did retain its forward-jutting grille, albeit in a slightly modified form. Thus modified, the car looked far less distinctive than its predecessors, and even its platform mates, the Oldsmobile Toronado and Cadillac Eldorado.

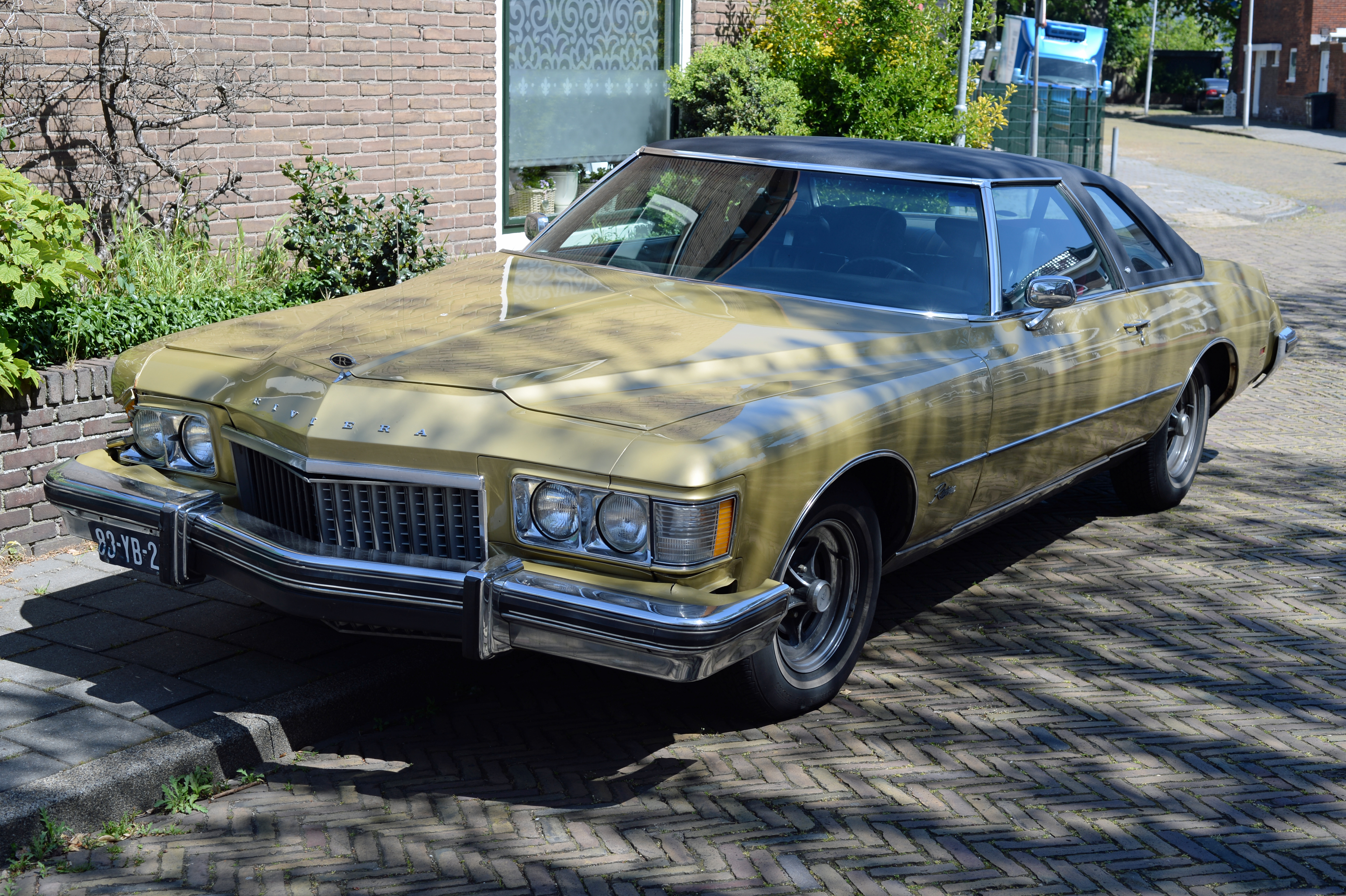
1974 Buick Riviera

The tamer-looking Riviera was no lighter, and its standard 455 V8 lost more power, dropping to 230 hp (172 kW) and 245 hp (183 kW) for standard and Stage One models respectively. Max Trac was dropped from the option list after 1974 due to a lack of buyer interest. The revised styling did not improve sales, which fell to 20,129 in 1974, although it is impossible to determine how much this was a result of the energy crisis and how much was due to the tame appearance. This generation introduced a novelty that later became federally mandated in a modified form, two high-mounted taillights above the trunk and below the rear window, which was shared on its platform twin the Toronado.

For 1975, the Riviera received an updated front fascia, which lost its forward-jutting theme through the redesign of the fiberglass front end cap. Quad rectangular headlights were mounted horizontally. The new vertical-bar grille echoed the "stand-up" theme that many GM cars of the day incorporated. Parking lights wrapped around the fender sides. The Stage One performance package was dropped for 1975, though the Gran Sport handling package would continue to be offered. The standard engine's output dipped to 205 hp (153 kW). Sales for 1975 were 17,306.

Minor changes greeted 1976 models, the most notable of which was a new crosshatch grille insert. The Gran Sport handling package was replaced by an 'S/R' package that had similar sporting pretensions. Sales rallied slightly to 20,082 for 1976.

== Fifth generation (1977–1978) ==
Fifth generation
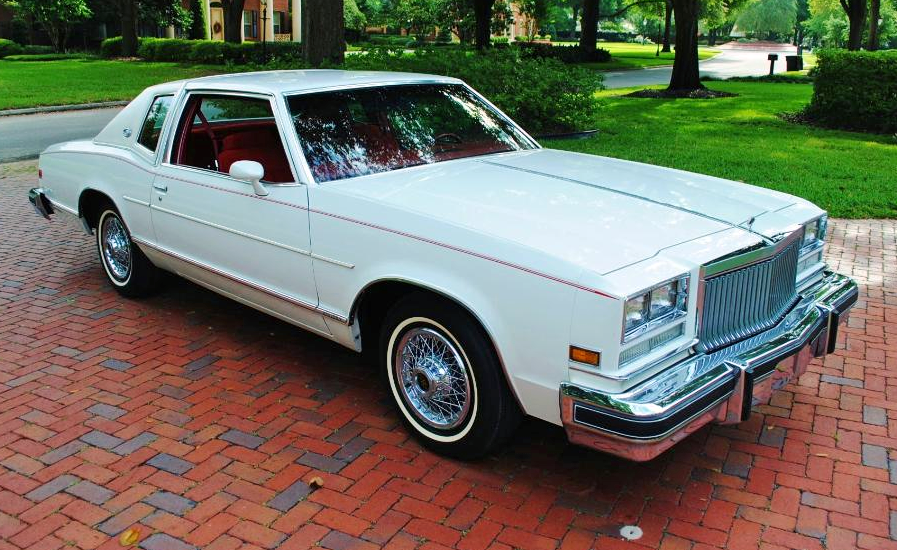

Overview
- Model years: 1977–1978
- Assembly: Flint, Michigan, United States (Buick City)

Body and chassis
- Body style: 2-door coupe
- Layout: FR layout
- Platform: B-body
- Related: Buick LeSabre; Buick Estate; Chevrolet Caprice; Chevrolet Impala; Oldsmobile 88; Oldsmobile Custom Cruiser; Pontiac Bonneville/Parisienne; Pontiac Catalina/Laurentian

Powertrain
- Engine: 350 cu in (5.7 L) Buick V8; 403 cu in (6.6 L) Oldsmobile V8
- Transmission: 3-speed TH-400 automatic

Dimensions
- Wheelbase: 115.9 in (2,944 mm)
- Length: 218.2 in (5,542 mm)

1977 Buick Riviera

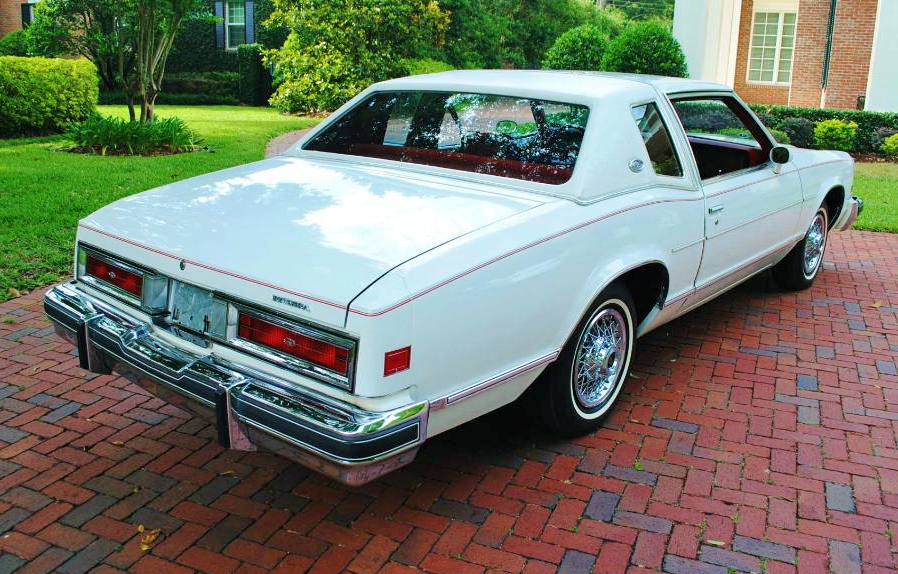
1978 Buick Riviera rear

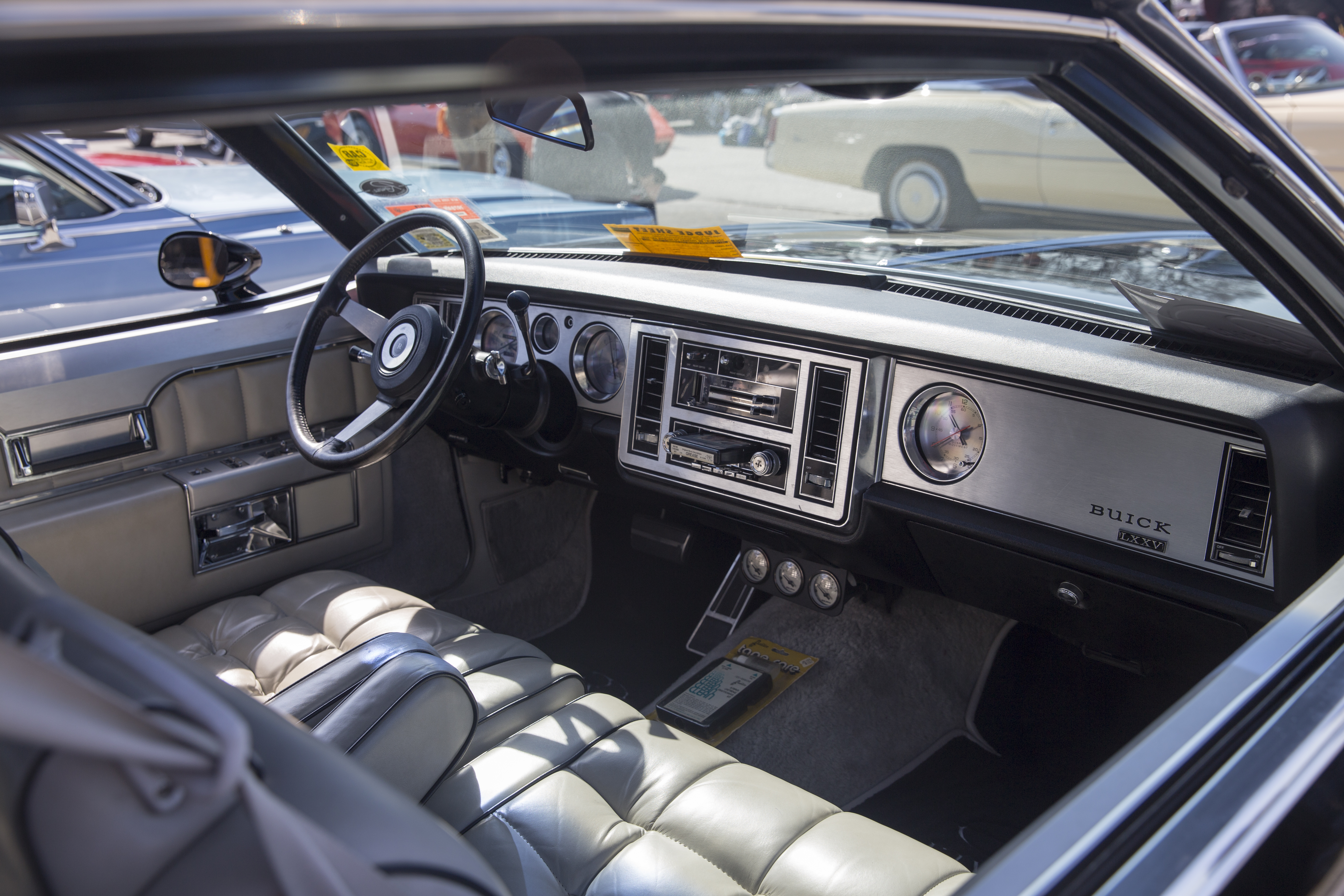
The interior of a 1978 Buick Riviera LXXV

Buick downsized the Riviera for 1977 onto the new smaller GM B platform. While the other E-bodies were front wheel drive since 1966 (1967 for Cadillac's Eldorado), the Buick E platform used a rear-wheel-drive B-body undercarriage (along with the cruciform frame of pre-1965 GMs for the 1966–70 generation). All B-bodies (including C and D platform GM RWDs) were downsized for the 1977 model year, which prompted the short-lived 1977/78 generation.

It was, in most respects, a Buick LeSabre coupe with unique styling (with quarter windows mimicking the 1975–78 Cadillac Eldorado). Unlike its LeSabre counterpart, the front fascia is vertical as opposed to slanted. Compared to the previous generation, it was reduced to a wheelbase of 115.9 in (2,940 mm), down 6.1 in (150 mm), and an overall length of 218.2 in (5,540 mm), down 4.8 in (120 mm). Weight was reduced by approximately 660 pounds (300 kg). The 455 engine was replaced by a 350 cu in (5.7 L) Buick V8 engine with 155 hp (116 kW) or an Oldsmobile-built 403 cu in (6.6 L) with 185 hp (138 kW). California models had a 170 hp (127 kW) Oldsmobile 350.

Sales were up modestly to 26,138 for 1977 and then fell to 20,535 for 1978, although this was a stopgap model until the all-new E-body cars would be ready for 1979. The 1977 and 1978 Rivieras were produced on the downsized GM B platform before the 1979 redesign on the FWD E-platform.

=== 75th Anniversary Package ===
For 1978, a special "LXXV" edition was released to commemorate Buick's 75th anniversary on the market. The production total was 2,889 and included special silver & black paint with gray leather seats with black trim, four-wheel disc brakes, brushed chrome trim, deep pile carpeting, and special LXXV name plates.

Production Figures

Buick Riviera Production Figures
	Coupe
1977	26,138
1978	20,535
Total	46,673

== Sixth generation (1979–1985) ==
Sixth generation
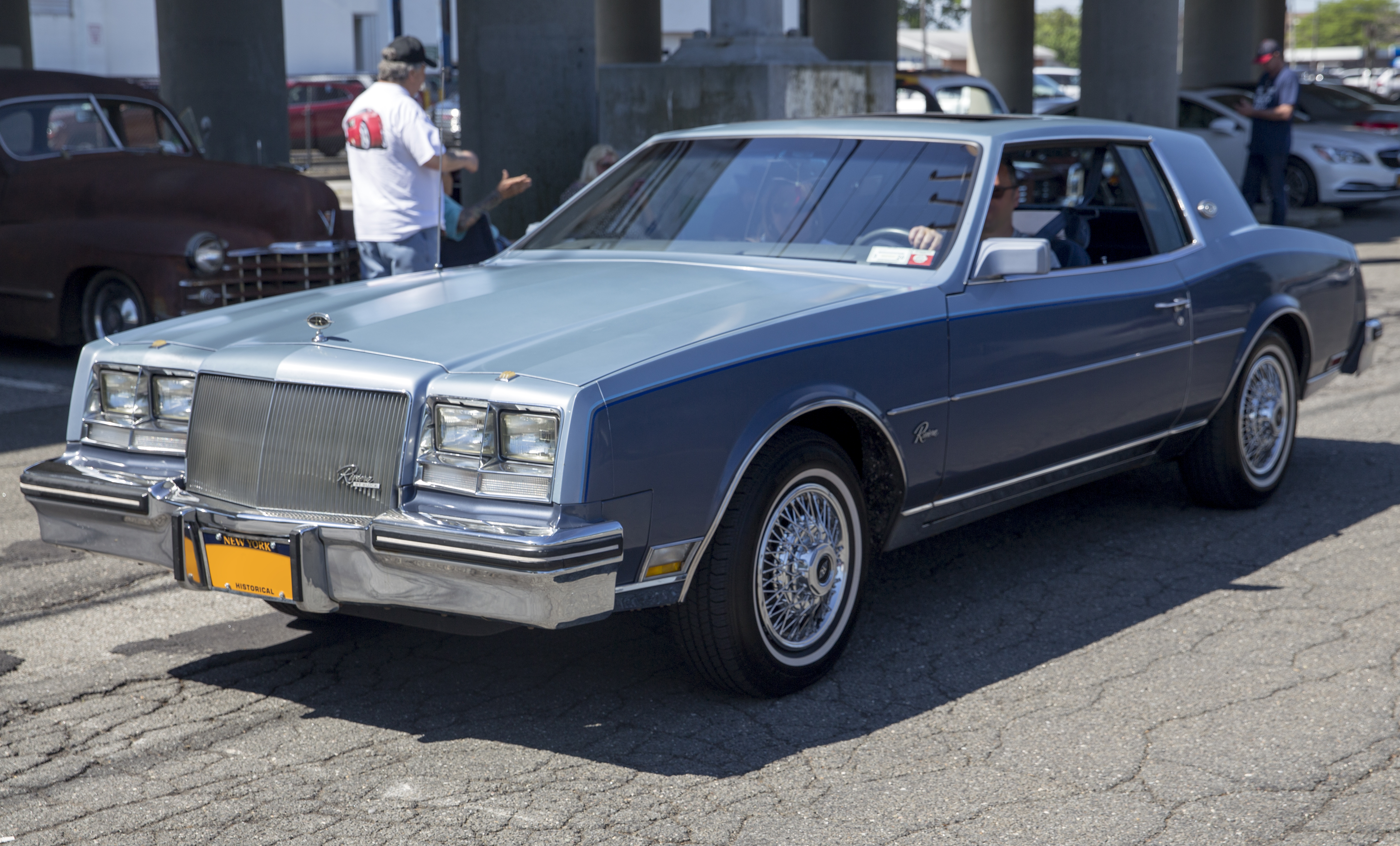
- 1984 Buick Riviera Coupe

Overview
- Model years: 1979–1985
- Assembly: Linden Assembly, Linden, New Jersey United States

Body and chassis
- Body style: 2-door convertible 2-door coupe
- Layout: Longitudinal front-engine, front-wheel drive
- Platform: E-body
- Related: Cadillac Eldorado; Oldsmobile Toronado

Powertrain
- Engine: 231 cu in (3.8 L) Buick V6; 231 cu in (3.8 L) Buick V6 Turbocharged; 252 cu in (4.1 L) Buick V6; 307 cu in (5.0 L) Oldsmobile V8; 350 cu in (5.7 L) Oldsmobile V8; 350 cu in (5.7 L) Oldsmobile diesel V8
- Transmission: 3-speed TH-325 automatic 4-speed THM325-4L automatic

Dimensions
- Wheelbase: 114.0 in (2,896 mm)
- Length: 206.0 in (5,232 mm)
- Width: 72.8 in (1,849 mm)

1979 Buick Riviera

Buick presented the 1979 model year front wheel drive Riviera, its first front-drive production model. Built on a 114 in (2,900 mm) wheelbase, it once again shared its mechanical design and platform with the Cadillac Eldorado and Oldsmobile Toronado. The Olds 403 and Buick 350 were dropped, but the Olds 350 remained, as did a new turbocharged Buick V6 engine of 231 cu in (3.8 L) displacement with 185 hp (138 kW) which was installed in the Riviera S-Type, shared with the Regal Sport Coupe turbo for the 1980 model year. The Riviera became Motor Trend's Car of the Year. Sales more than doubled, to 52,181 for 1979 and 48,621 for the similar 1980 models.

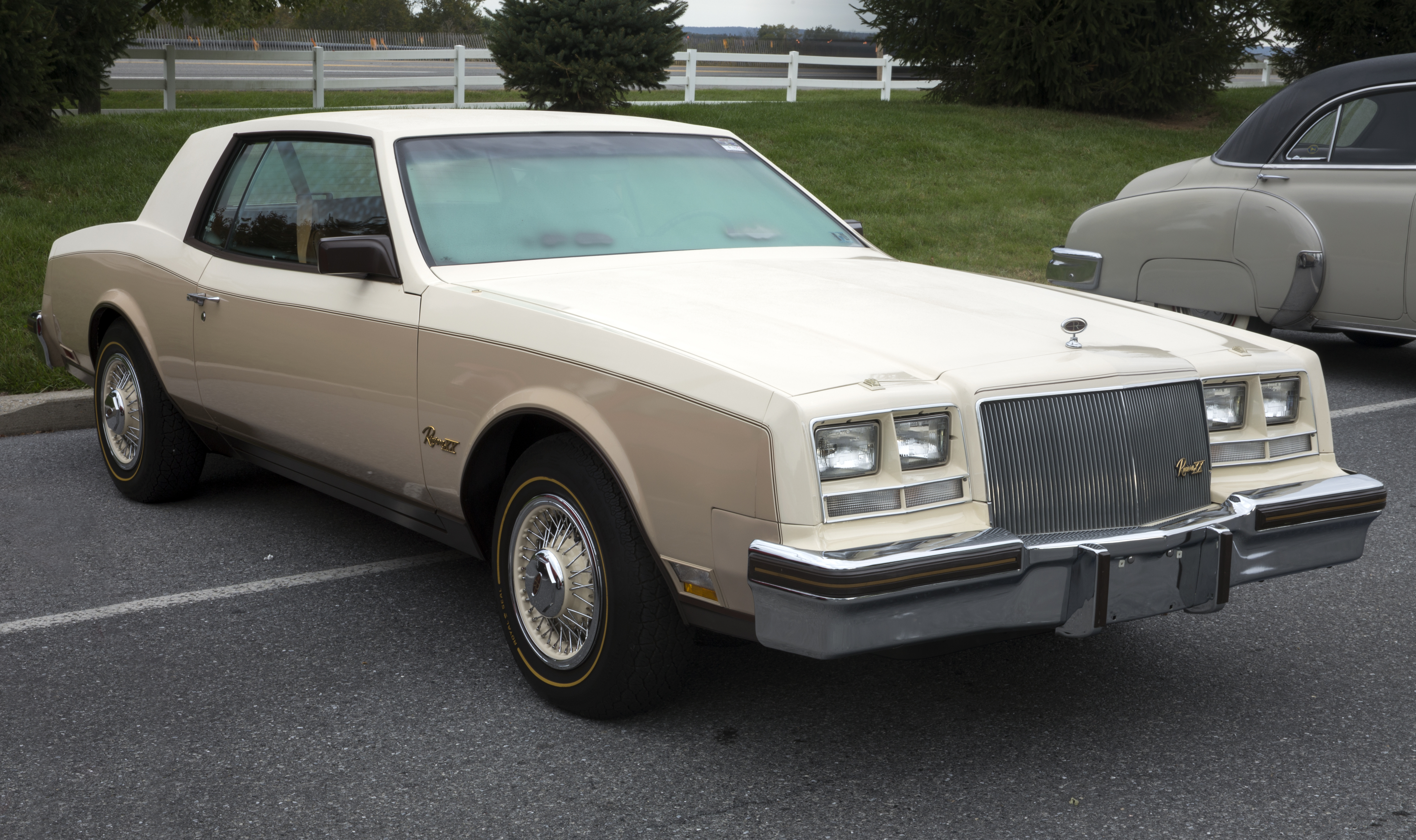
1983 Buick Riviera XX special edition

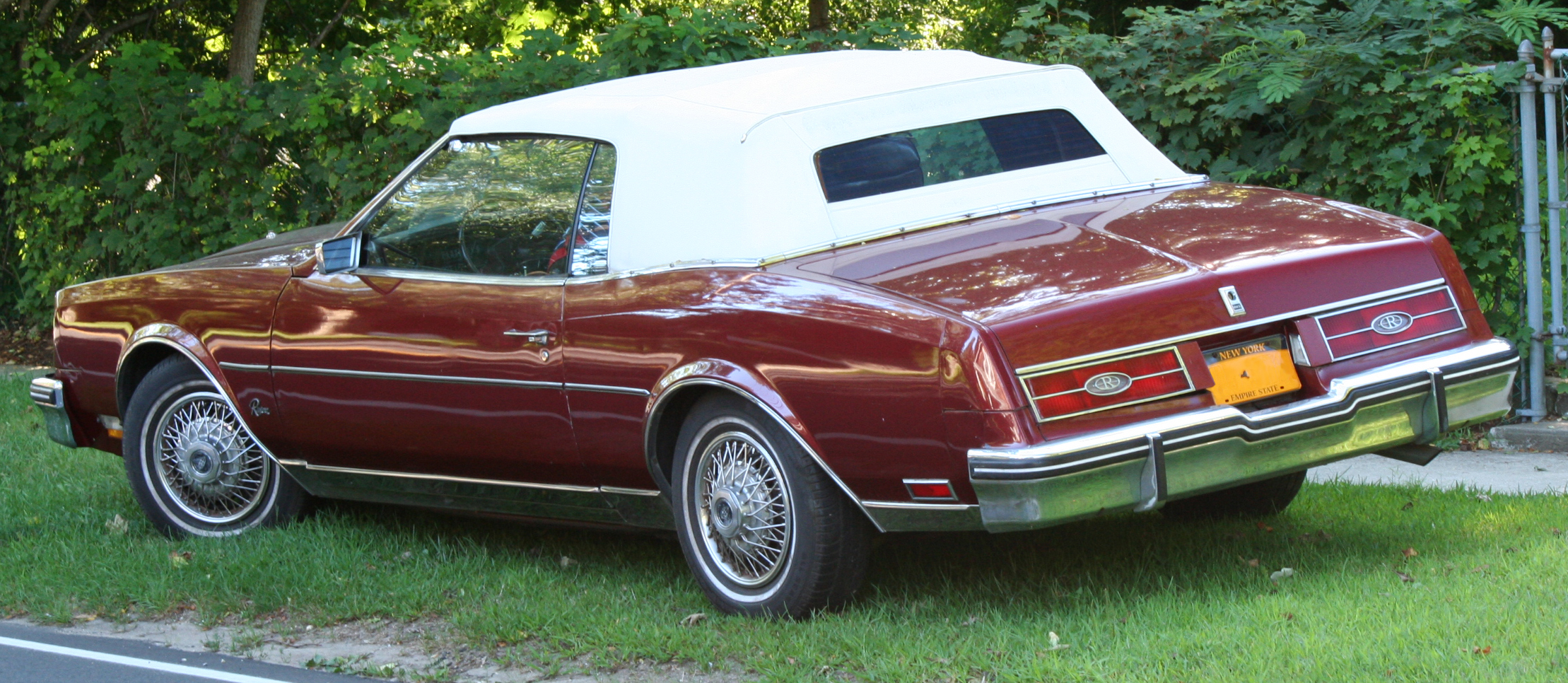
Rear view of a 1984 Riviera convertible

1981 saw the Turbo renamed T-Type and the demise of the 350 engine in favor of the Oldsmobile-built 307 cu in (5.0 L) with 140 hp (104 kW) (phased in during the 1980 MY). The standard engine was now Buick's 125 hp (93 kW) 252 cu in (4.1 L) V6, and a new option was an Oldsmobile diesel engine with a mere 105 hp (78 kW) offered through 1985. 1982 also saw the first-ever Riviera convertible, although relatively few were built, owing to a high price - US$23,944 ($79,882 in 2025 dollars). The Riviera convertible was available in white or red Firemist with red leather. A twin-turbocharged Riviera convertible was chosen to be the pace car at the 1983 Indianapolis 500, tuned to produce 410 hp (306 kW). Most convertible Rivieras had the V8 engine, which saw an increase in rated SAE net HP to 150 for both convertibles and coupes fitted with it from 1982 through the 1985 model year.

In 1983, a special edition of 500 "Riviera XX" was offered, celebrating twenty years since the introduction of the first Riviera (502 were built in the end). These have a special two-tone exterior paint, real wire wheels, a leather, and walnut interior as well as 24-karat gold plated "Riviera XX" badging. The Riviera XX also received a special grille, which then became part of the 1984 model year facelift model. Overall sales made the 1980s Riviera a great success, reaching 65,305 for the 1985 model year.

Production Figures

Buick Riviera Production Figures
	Coupe	T Type	Convertible	Yearly Total
1979	37,881	14,300	-	52,181
1980	41,404	7,217	-	48,621
1981	48,017	3,990	-	52,007
1982	42,823	N/A	1,248	44,071
1983	47,153	1,331	1,750	50,234
1984	56,210	1,153	500	57,863
1985	63,836	1,069	400	65,305
Total	337,324	29,060	3,898	370,282

== Seventh generation (1986–1993) ==
Seventh generation
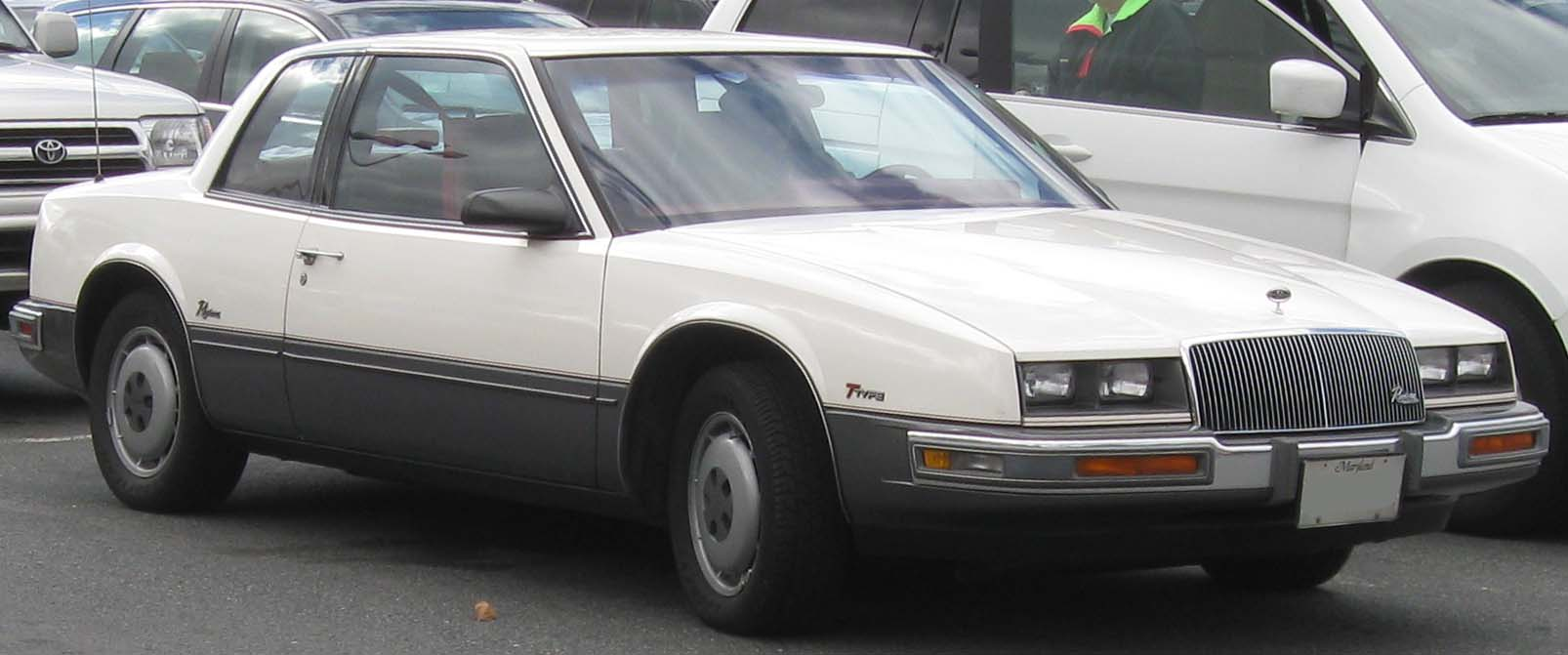
- 1986–1988 Riviera T-Type (pre-facelift)

Overview
- Model years: 1986–1993
- Assembly: Detroit/Hamtramck Assembly, Michigan, United States

Body and chassis
- Body style: 2-door coupe
- Layout: Transverse front-engine, front-wheel drive
- Platform: E-body
- Related: Cadillac Eldorado; Oldsmobile Toronado; Buick Reatta

Powertrain
- Engine: 3.8 L LG2/LG3/LN3/L27 OHV V6
- Transmission: 4-speed THM440-T4 automatic

Dimensions
- Wheelbase: 108.0 in (2,743 mm)
- Length: 1986–88: 187.8 in (4,770 mm); 1989-93 198.3 in (5,037 mm)
- Width: 1986–88: 71.7 in (1,821 mm); 1989–93: 73.1 in (1,857 mm)
- Height: 1986–88: 53.5 in (1,359 mm); 1989–1990: 53.6 in (1,361 mm); 1991–93: 52.9 in (1,344 mm)
- Curb weight: 3,309 lb (1,501 kg)

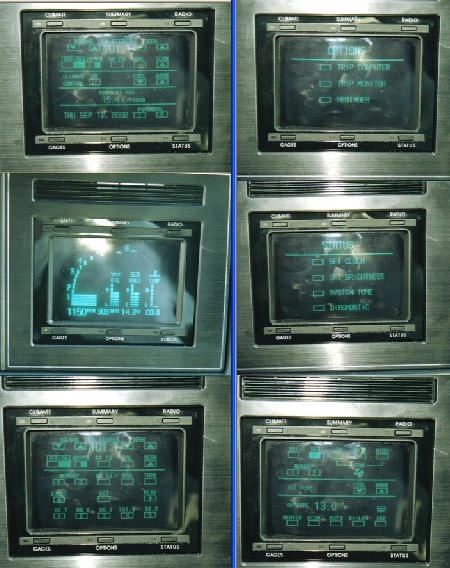
Buick Graphic Control

The E-body coupes were converted to unibody construction and transverse front-wheel drive — and was further downsized for 1986, to a 108 in (2,743 mm) wheelbase. The V6 was now the only engine, fitted with sequential fuel injection (SFI) and was rated initially at 140 hp (104 kW) SAE (LG2) and 200 lb⋅ft (271 N⋅m) of torque. It used the Turbo-Hydramatic 440-T4 automatic transmission with a 2.84:1 final drive ratio. The 3.8 was the only engine used for the seventh generation Riviera, although its power climbed incrementally over the years. For 1987, the engine was changed to the LG3 with roller lifters rather than flat lifters, power increased to 150 hp (112 kW) SAE while the torque remained unchanged. This was replaced by the LN3, with power and torque up to 165 hp (123 kW) and 210 lb⋅ft (285 N⋅m) respectively thanks to multi-port fuel injection, balance shafts, and other improvements. The LN3 was used from 1988 until 1990. For the last three model years Buick used the L27 iteration with sequential, tuned port fuel injection (TPI), which gained a few more horsepower and more mid-range torque from a new, two-piece intake manifold with longer runners. Power crept up to 170 hp (127 kW) at 4,800 rpm, torque was up to 220 lb⋅ft (298 N⋅m) at 3,200 rpm.

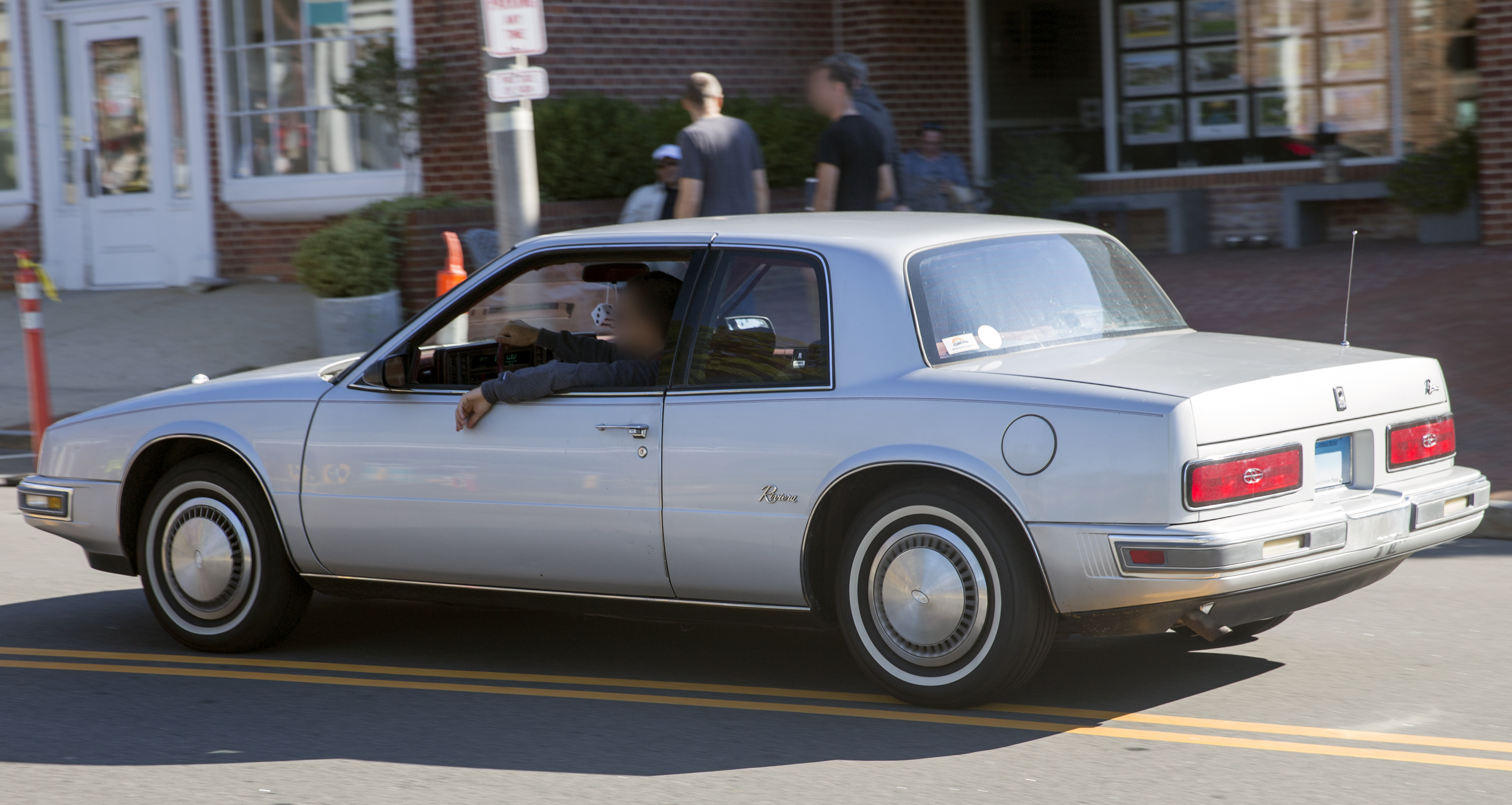
1986–1989 Riviera rear (pre-facelift)

This generation featured the Graphic Control Center (GCC), an advanced electronic instrumentation system which employed a dash-mounted 9-inch (230 mm) monochrome touchscreen CRT display. The GCC controlled the vehicle's climate control system and stereo, and also supplied advanced instrumentation such as a trip computer, vehicle diagnostics, and a maintenance reminder feature. Four-wheel disc brakes were standard. With a choice of three suspension packages available, up to the performance-oriented FE3 setting, handling was notably improved. The Riviera placed fourth for Motor Trend's 1986 Car of the Year contest.

The seventh generation Riviera saw the installation of Dynaride, which was an air compressor that would pressurize the rear Chapman struts to maintain a level overall ride height. A badge was installed on the dashboard to the left of the steering column on all vehicles equipped. It was not available on vehicles equipped with Gran Touring Suspension.

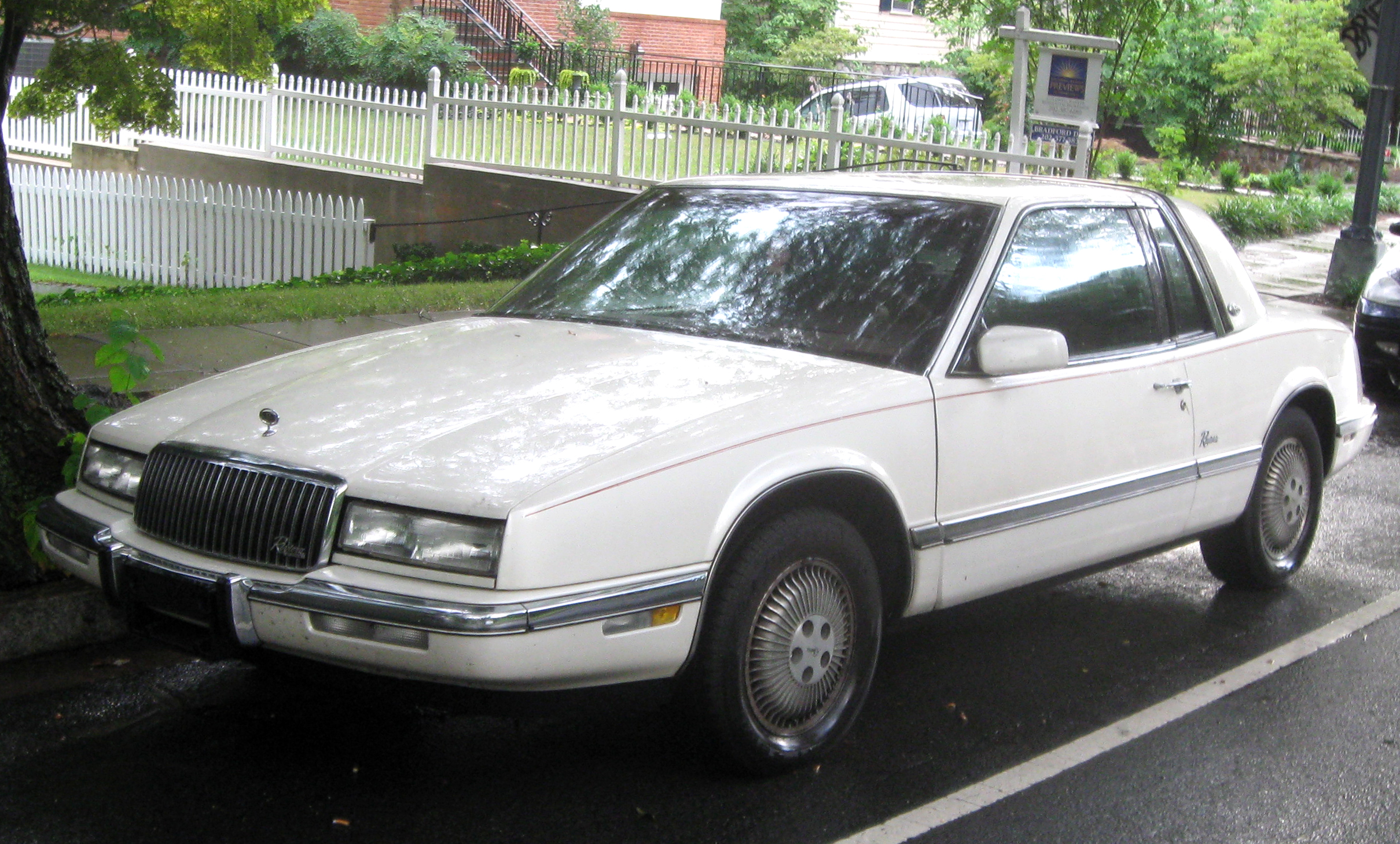
1989–1993 Riviera (facelift)

1989–1993 Riviera rear (facelift)

Fuel economy was notably improved for the 1986 Riviera. Prices increase to $19,831 ($58,247 in 2025 dollars) for the base model and $21,577 for the T-Type ($63,375 in 2025 dollars). Sales declined to 22,138 for 1986, 15,223 for 1987, and 8,625 for 1988. 1988 also saw the introduction of Buick's Reatta coupe, a two-seat personal luxury car.

The Riviera was restyled for 1989, adding 11 inches (280 mm) to the overall length (on an unchanged wheelbase). Sales rose to 21,189 for 1989, but dropped to a low of 4,555 for 1993, the abbreviated final model year of this generation.

Seventh-generation production figures
	Yearly Total
1986	22,138
1987	15,223
1988	8,625
1989	21,189
1990	22,526
1991	13,168
1992	12,324
1993	4,555
Total	119,748

== Eighth generation (1995–1999) ==
Eighth generation
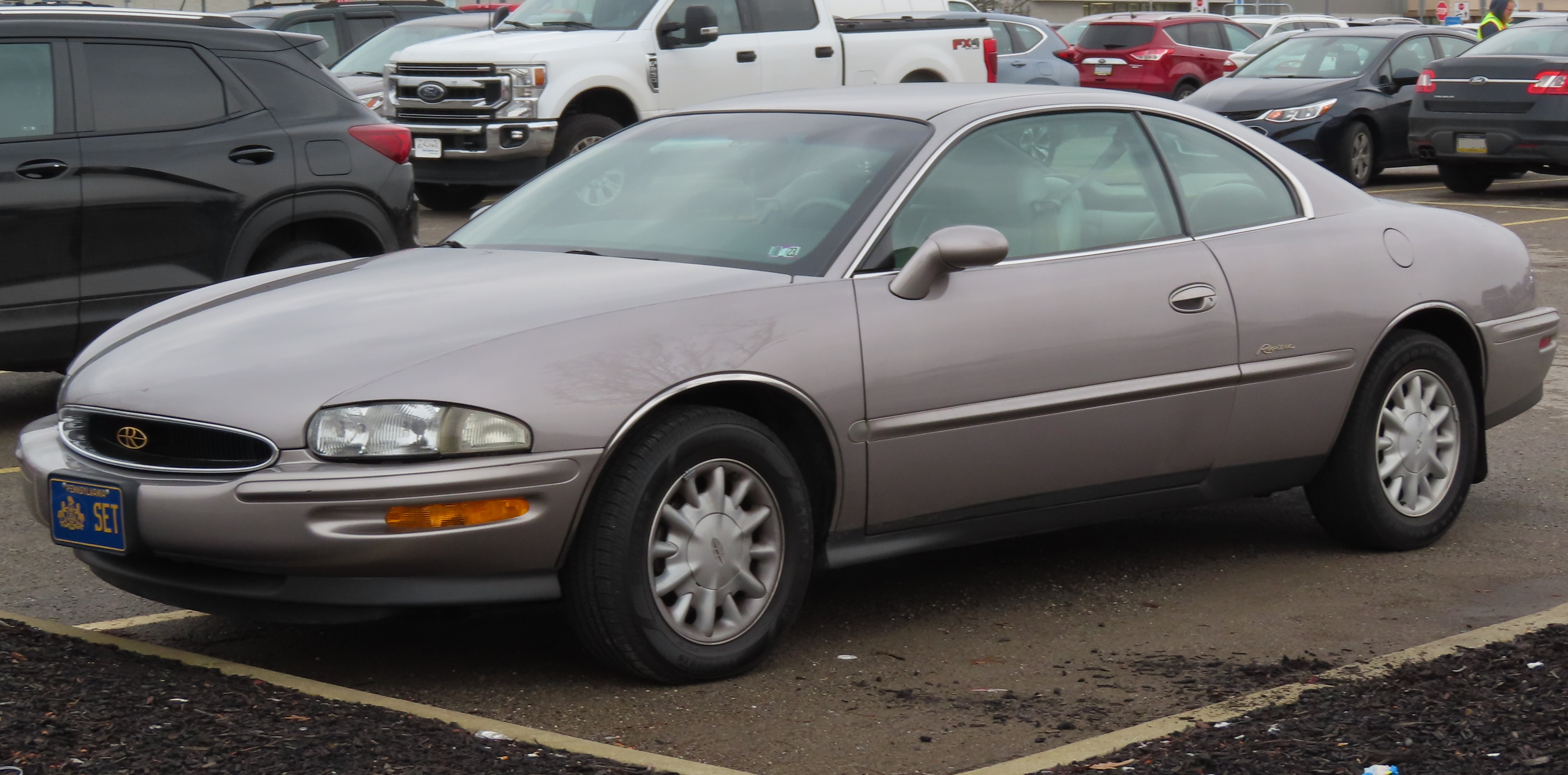

Overview
- Production: May 23, 1994 – November 25, 1998
- Model years: 1995–1999
- Assembly: Orion Township, Michigan, U.S. (Orion Assembly)
- Designer: William L. Porter; Andy Hansel, Asst. Chief Designer; Paul Tatseos, Design Chief, Interior

Body and chassis
- Body style: 2-door coupe
- Layout: Transverse front-engine, front-wheel drive
- Platform: G II-body
- Related: Oldsmobile Aurora; Cadillac Seville; Buick Park Avenue

Powertrain
- Engine: 3.8 L L36 V6; 3.8 L L67 SC V6
- Transmission: 4-speed 4T60E automatic (1995–1996 N/A); 4-speed 4T60E-HD automatic (1996 Supercharged); 4-speed 4T65E-HD automatic (1997–1999)

Dimensions
- Wheelbase: 113.8 in (2,891 mm)
- Length: 207.0 in (5,258 mm)
- Width: 75.0 in (1,905 mm)
- Height: 55.2 in (1,402 mm)
- Curb weight: 3,788 lb (1,718 kg)

After a hiatus for the 1994 model year, the Riviera returned for the 1995 model year with a complete redesign. The 205 hp (153 kW) naturally aspirated 3800 V6 was the standard engine, with an optional supercharged 3800 V6 rated at 225 hp (168 kW) and 275 lb⋅ft (373 N⋅m). The eighth generation was manufactured in Orion Township, Michigan, using the same Cadillac-derived G platform as the 4-door Oldsmobile Aurora. The first of 41,422 1995 Rivieras was manufactured on May 23, 1994.

In 1996, the supercharged engine's output increased to 240 hp (179 kW) and 280 lb⋅ft (380 N⋅m), paired with a 4T60E-HD transmission. 18,036 Rivieras were manufactured in 1996.

For the 1997 model year, engineers revised the suspension revisions, removing weight. An upgraded 4T65E-HD transmission featuring a larger 10.2 in (258 mm) torque converter and heavy-duty gearbox were added. 18,827 were made in 1997.

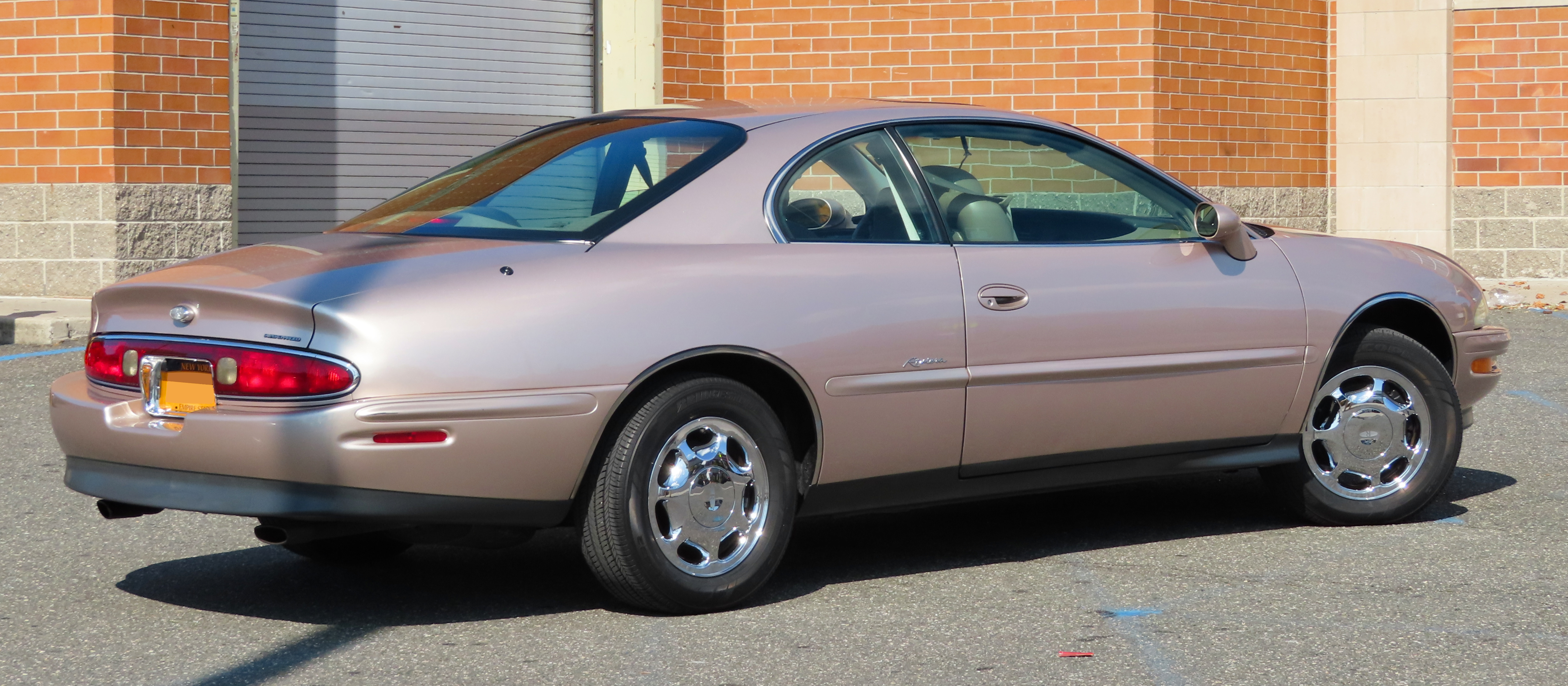
1999 Buick Riviera rear

For 1998, the 240 hp (179 kW) supercharged V6 became standard. GM's OnStar service was added as an option, along with minor interior design changes and features including new passenger heated seats and the removal of the front "55/45" 3-seater split bench option. A total of 10,953 units were produced for 1998.

With sales of all coupes declining in the North American market, GM discontinued the Riviera. 1999 was the car's last model year with production of 1,956 cars ending on November 25, 1998. The final 200 cars, marketed as Silver Arrow models, carried special silver paint and trim, recalling several earlier Silver Arrow concept cars using the earliest Riviera by Bill Mitchell.

The Eighth-generation Riviera's supercharged OHV V6 enabled a 0–60 miles per hour (0–97 km/h) time of under 7 seconds and a standing 1/4 mile (400 m) in 15.5 seconds, with EPA mileage estimates of 18 mpg_{‑US} (13 L/100 km; 22 mpg_{‑imp}) / 27 mpg_{‑US} (8.7 L/100 km; 32 mpg_{‑imp}) (city/highway).

Eighth-generation production figures
	Yearly Total
1995	41,422
1996	17,389
1997	18,199
1998	10,613
1999	1,956
Total	89,579

=== Engines ===
Year	Engine	Power	Torque
1995–1997	3.8 L L36 3800 Series II V6	205 hp (153 kW) at 5200 rpm	230 lb⋅ft (312 N⋅m) at 4000 rpm
1995	3.8 L L67 3800 Series I Supercharged V6	225 hp (168 kW) at 5000 rpm	275 lb⋅ft (373 N⋅m) at 3200 rpm
1996–1999	3.8 L L67 3800 Series II Supercharged V6	240 hp (179 kW) at 5200 rpm	280 lb⋅ft (380 N⋅m) at 3600 rpm

== Concept cars ==
=== 2007 concept ===
2007 Riviera Concept

Overview
- Designer: James C. Shyr

Body and chassis
- Body style: 2-door 4-seater coupe
- Doors: gullwing

Dimensions
- Wheelbase: 2,870 mm (113.0 in)
- Length: 4,710 mm (185.4 in)
- Width: 1,940 mm (76.4 in)
- Height: 1,415 mm (55.7 in)

At the 2007 Shanghai Motor Show, Buick debuted a concept coupe named Riviera, based on the GM Epsilon II platform. The concept was later shown at the 2008 North American International Auto Show.

It was designed by the Pan Asia Technical Automotive Center (PATAC). The design was inspired by classic Buicks, ancient Chinese artifacts, and modern electronic icons. It includes "icy green" backlighting, Shell Blue body, gull-wing doors, a 2+2 seating configuration, and 21-inch 10-spoke forged aluminum wheels.

=== 2013 concept ===
2013 Riviera Concept
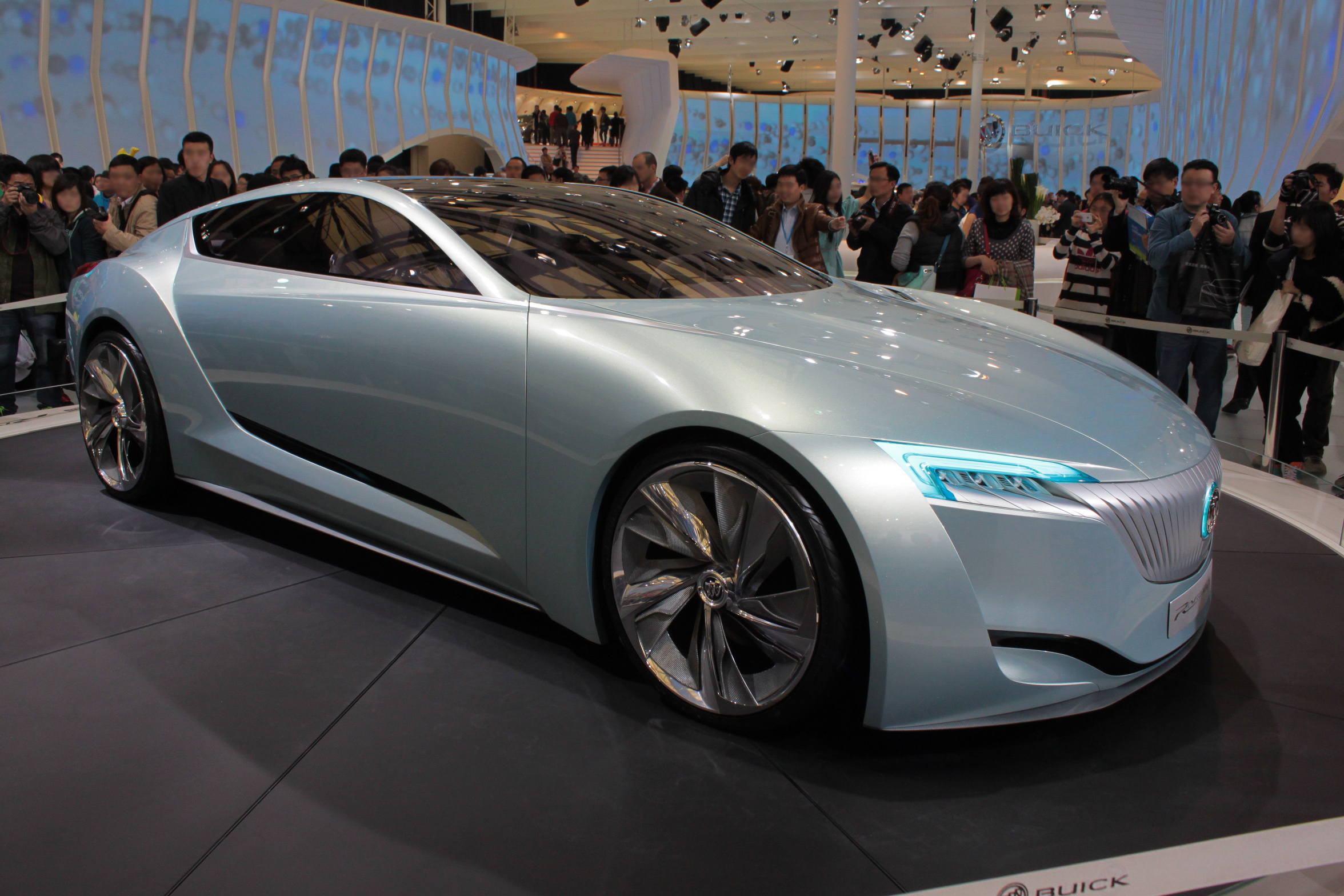

Body and chassis
- Body style: 2-door 4-seater coupe
- Doors: gullwing

Powertrain
- Electric motor: 4x Motors (1 per wheel)
- Hybrid drivetrain: Dual-mode W-PHEV

Another concept Riviera was shown at the 2013 Shanghai Motor Show, again developed by the Pan Asia Technical Automotive Center PATAC. It has gull-wing doors and a plug-in electric driveline as well as four wheel steering, electromagnetically controlled suspension with air springs, built in 4G LTE connection, transparent A pillar and wireless charging.
