= CT-4 =

CT-4 or CT 4 can refer to:

- PAC CT/4
- Connecticut's 4th congressional district
- Connecticut Route 4
- ČT4 Sport, a Czech television channel
- Cadillac CT4
- Australian Information Technology Company - CT4
