= Pontiac G8 =

American full-size sedan

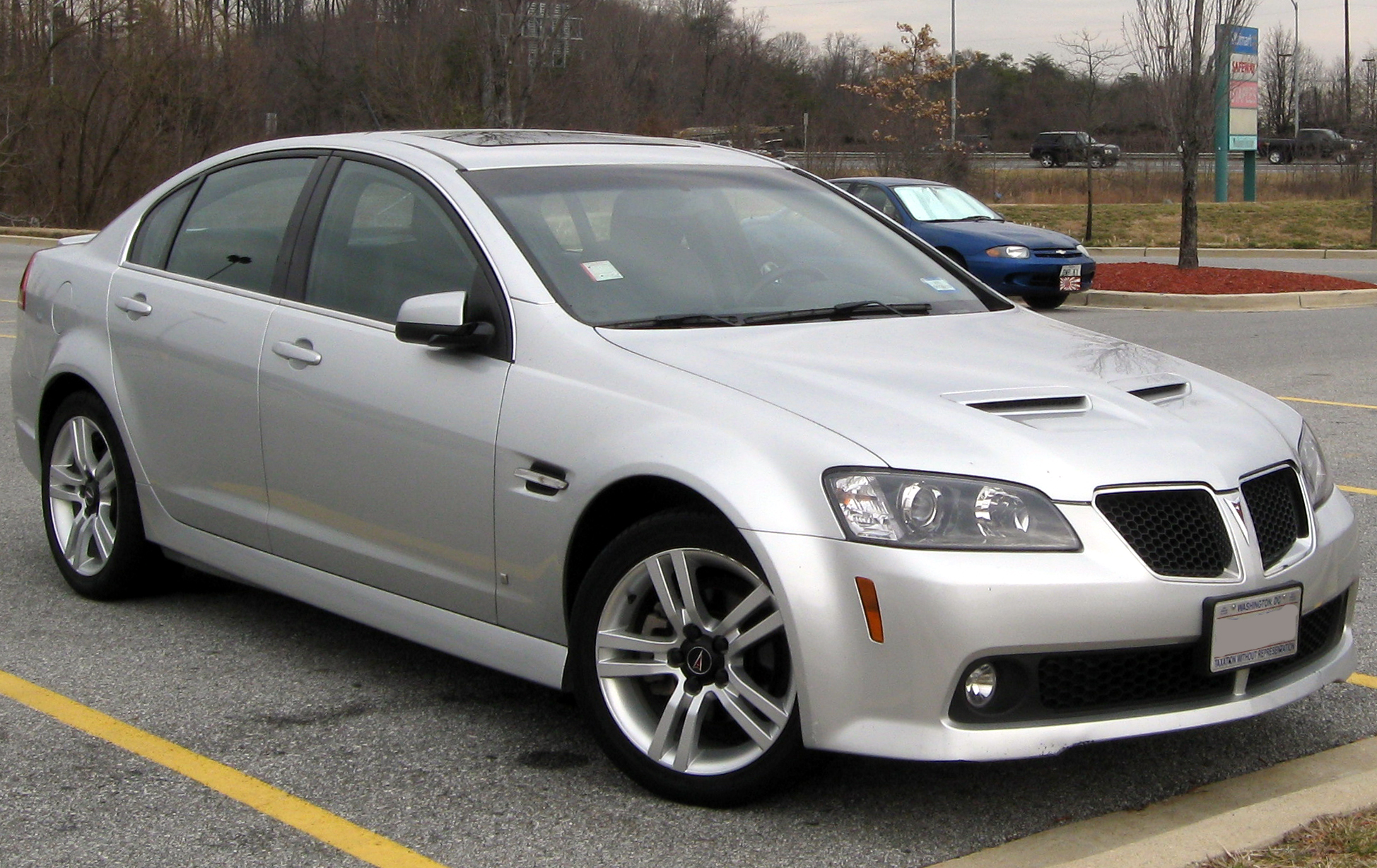

Overview
- Manufacturer: Holden (General Motors)
- Model code: GMX557
- Also called: Chevrolet Lumina (Middle East, South East Asia, South Africa); Chevrolet Omega (Brazil); Holden Commodore (VE)
- Production: December 2007 – June 2009
- Model years: 2008–2009
- Assembly: Australia: Adelaide (Holden Elizabeth Plant)

Body and chassis
- Class: Full-size car
- Body style: 4-door sedan
- Layout: Front engine, rear-wheel drive
- Platform: GM Zeta platform
- Related: Buick Park Avenue; Chevrolet Camaro; Chevrolet Caprice; Holden Statesman/Caprice (WM/WN)

Powertrain
- Engine: 3.6 L LY7 V6; 6.0 L L76 V8; 6.2 L LS3 V8
- Transmission: 5-speed 5L40-E automatic 6-speed 6L80-E automatic 6-speed Tremec TR-6060 manual

Dimensions
- Wheelbase: 114.7 in (2,913 mm)
- Length: 196.1 in (4,981 mm)
- Width: 74.8 in (1,900 mm)
- Height: 57.7 in (1,466 mm)
- Curb weight: 3,946 lb (1,790 kg)

Chronology
- Predecessor: Pontiac Bonneville (2005); Pontiac Grand Prix (2008)
- Successor: Chevrolet SS (U.S.)

The Pontiac G8 is a full-size sedan that was produced by Holden in Australia for export to the United States, where it was sold by Pontiac. The G8, a rebadged Holden Commodore, was released in early 2008 for the 2008 model year in the United States, and in 2008 for the 2009 model year in Canada. Production stopped in mid-2009, following the decision by GM to discontinue Pontiac. While available, the G8 took the place in the Pontiac lineup of both the Pontiac Bonneville, which ceased production after the 2005 model year, and the Pontiac Grand Prix, which ceased production after the 2008 model year.

By December 2008, the rear wheel drive G8 had not become the expected sales replacement for the previous front-drive models, with 11,000 unsold G8s in the inventory and just 13,000 sold. During the 2009 global economic downturn, market prices had dropped by $3000–5000 below GM's sticker price for the car. By July 2009, there were only 5,000 unsold G8s in inventory, with almost 30,700 sold.

With the imminent demise of the Pontiac brand, a result of GM's Chapter 11 bankruptcy, the 2009 model year marked the end of all Pontiacs, including the G8. However, in July 2009, Bob Lutz made an off-hand comment during a press review that the G8 would be revived as the Chevrolet Caprice. Subsequently, Lutz retracted this statement, citing market conditions. Nevertheless, General Motors announced the Chevrolet Caprice Police Patrol Vehicle (PPV) in 2009, which Car and Driver described as a successor to the G8. To fill the gap left by the G8, GM announced the Chevrolet SS, a RWD V8 powered sedan for 2014 based on the Holden Commodore (VF).

== Background ==
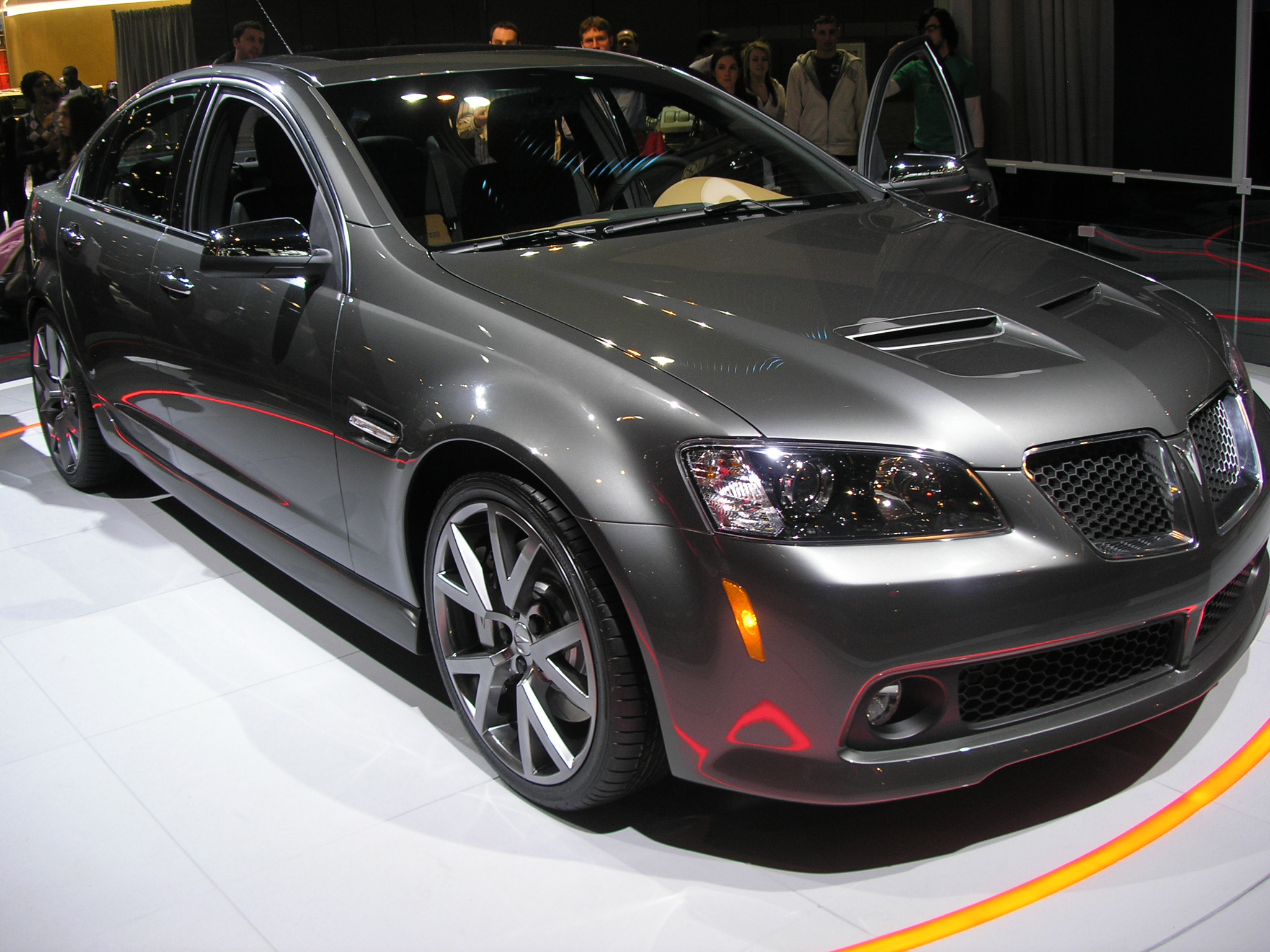
Pontiac G8 Concept

The G8 is based on the GM Zeta platform, created by Holden for the VE Commodore in the Australian market. The G8's model number is GMX557. The G8 differs from the Commodore mainly in frontal styling and interior details. At the January 2007 North American International Auto Show in Detroit, GM chairman Bob Lutz confirmed that GM intended to import Holden Commodores into North America as Pontiac G8s. The news was not planned to be officially announced until the Chicago Auto Show in February.

Holden chairman Denny Mooney announced that the G8 is imported from the Holden Elizabeth Plant for the life cycle of the car, but refused to comment on possible future production at GM's Oshawa, Ontario facility. At the 2007 Chicago Auto Show, GM Global Chairman Bob Lutz announced that the G8 was expected in US Pontiac dealerships in "early 2008". On 4 July 2007 the first Pontiac G8 prototypes rolled out of the Elizabeth assembly plant in Australia. General production began 18 December 2007.

The G8 was the first rear-wheel drive four-door sedan sold under the Pontiac name since the 1986 Bonneville and Parisienne. However, at the time of the G8's release, Pontiac did offer the rear-wheel drive Solstice. The then recently discontinued GTO (as well as the Firebird/Trans Am before it), also utilized the rear-wheel drive layout. The GTO was another Holden product, known as the Monaro in Australia, repurposed and rebadged for U.S. consumption. Production was discontinued in 2006 due to new US safety regulations and the architecture being phased out worldwide in favor of the new Zeta platform on which the G8 is based.

== Specification levels ==
=== G8 ===
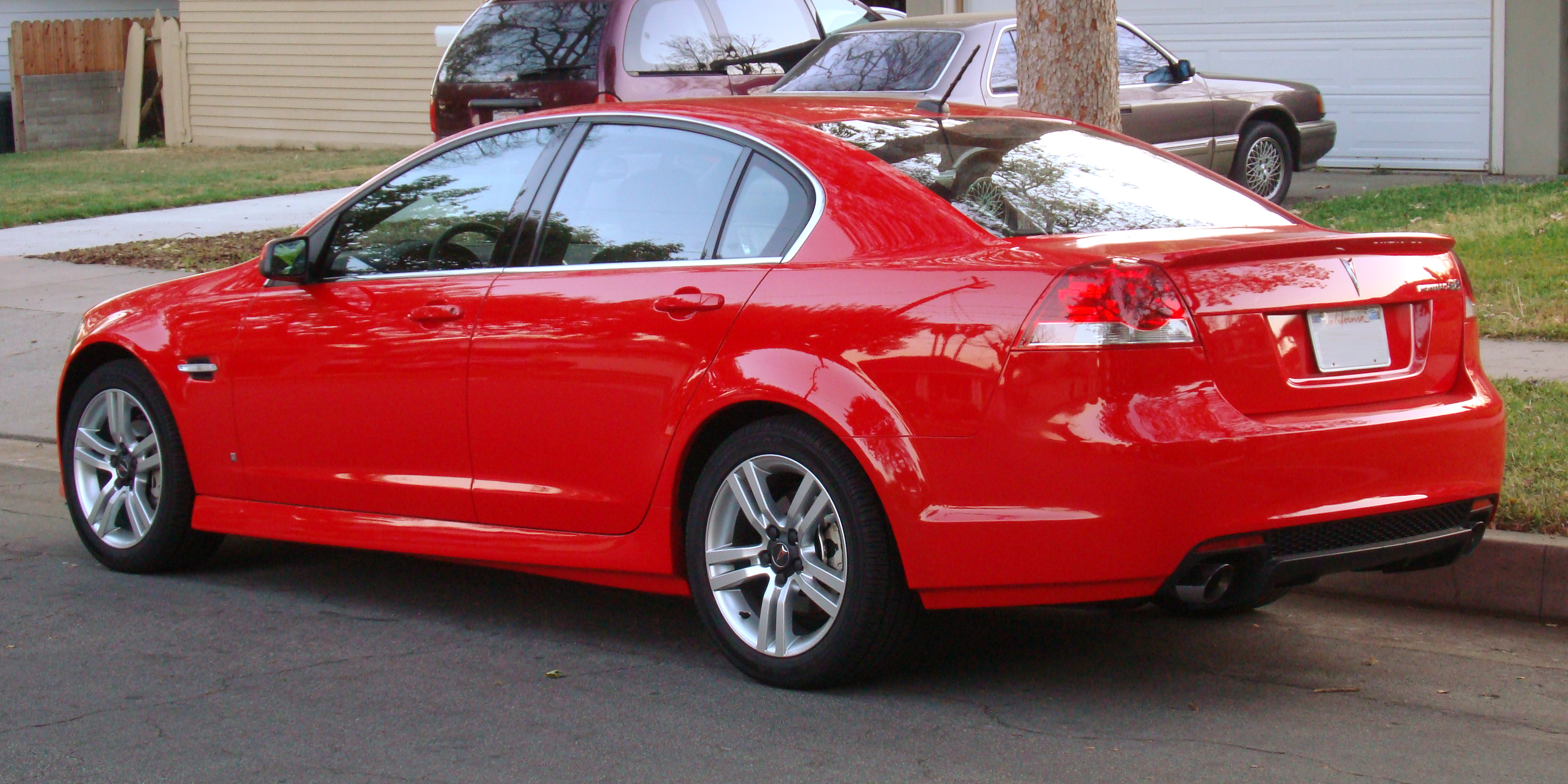
2008 Pontiac G8 "base".

The base G8, referred to in Pontiac sales literature as the "G8 Sedan", is available with a 3.6-liter High Feature V6 engine, producing 256 hp (191 kW). The only transmission available is a five-speed GM 5L40-E automatic; fuel economy is officially rated at 17 mpg_{‑US} (14 L/100 km) city/25 mpg_{‑US} (9.4 L/100 km) highway.

Base G8 models come standard with six airbags (including full-length side curtain airbags), traction control, electronic stability control, dual tailpipes, 18-inch alloy wheels (fitted with either all-season or summer performance tires), sports body kit, fog lights, power windows and locks, cruise control, black cloth seats and a seven-speaker audio system, including front center speaker, single-disc CD player, and auxiliary input jack.

A "Comfort And Sound" package is available on V6 powered G8s, which upgrades the seven-speaker audio system and manual HVAC controls to the 11-speaker audio and automatic climate control found in the GT model. The "Premium" package upgrades the Sedan's cloth seats to leather seating surfaces, driver and passenger heated seats, six-way power driver seat adjuster, 6-way power front-passenger seat adjuster, rear center armrest, leather-wrapped shift lever, and the GT's standard leather-wrapped steering wheel. Both the base G8 and the GT utilize the "FE2" suspension package.

=== G8 GT ===
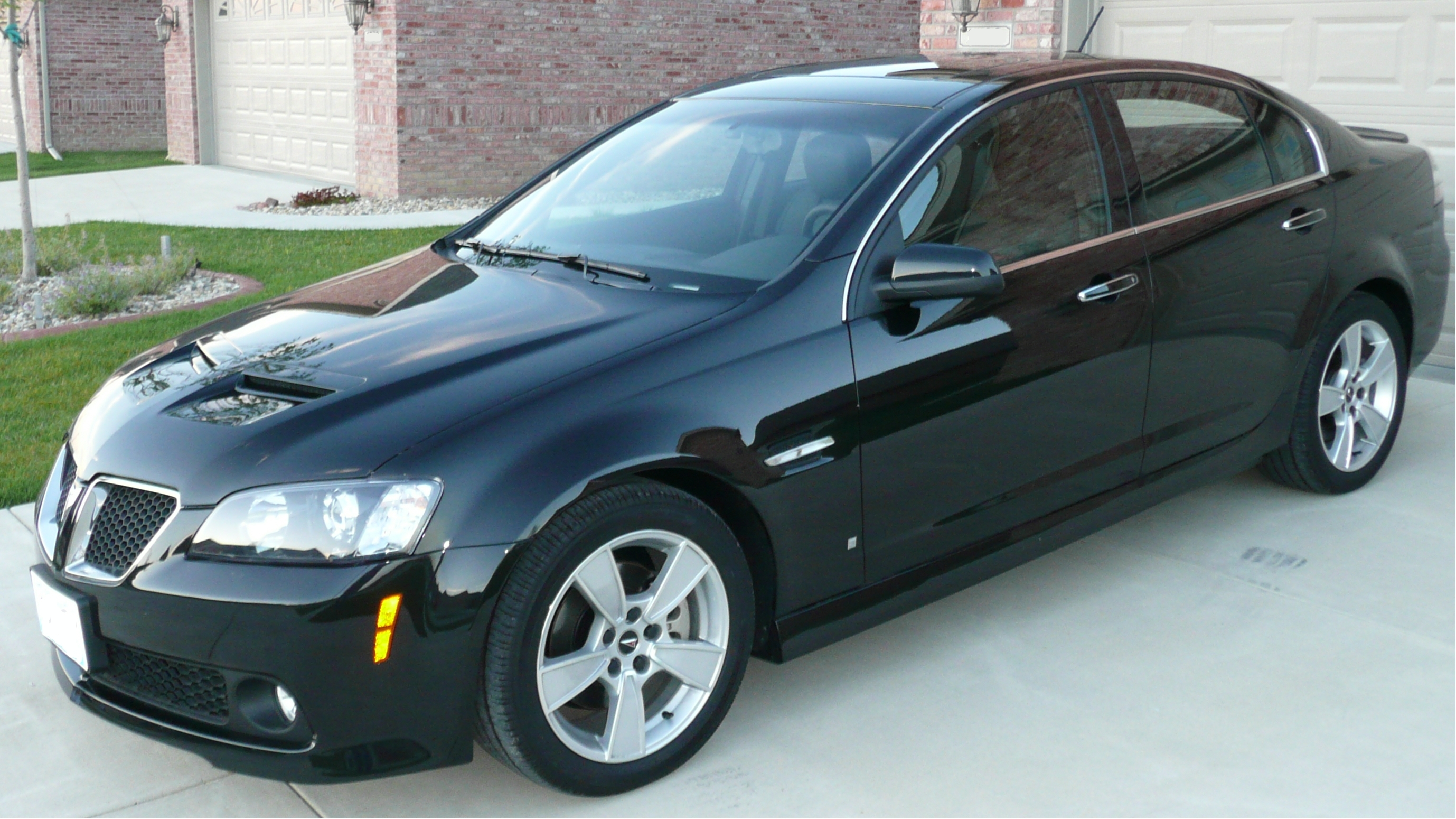
2009 Pontiac G8 GT.

The GT comes with a 361 hp (269 kW) 6.0 L (364 cu in) Generation IV V8, featuring a 6-speed 6L80 automatic and Active Fuel Management, capable of reaching 60 mph (97 km/h) in 5.2 seconds, with quarter-mile times as low as 13.4 seconds. The G8 GT averages a fuel economy of 15/24 mpg (city/highway). A 6-speed manual was being considered as an option on the GT model, but Pontiac decided against offering it, stating that it would instead be offered as an option on the G8 GXP. One change in 2009 was the deletion of the center stack oil pressure and voltage gauges. Midway through the 2009 model year a few changes were made to the G8 GT, including an additional pair of catalytic converters which reduced engine output to 355 hp (265 kW), the addition of bluetooth and rear cup holders that pulled out from under the rear seats.

In addition to the larger engine and six-speed transmission, GT models also contain additional equipment, including all of the standard Sedan features plus quad tailpipes, clear taillight lenses (as opposed to the Sedan's traditional red taillights), automatic dual-zone air conditioning, a larger center-console display screen, and an 11-speaker Blaupunkt premium audio system with 2 subwoofers, six-disc CD changer, and auxiliary input jack. Some (but not all) of these features are available as options on the base model. A sports package is available on the GT, adding sport metallic pedals, QS4 19" machine-faced aluminum wheels, summer performance tires and a slightly smaller diameter, leather-wrapped Sport steering wheel.

=== G8 GXP ===
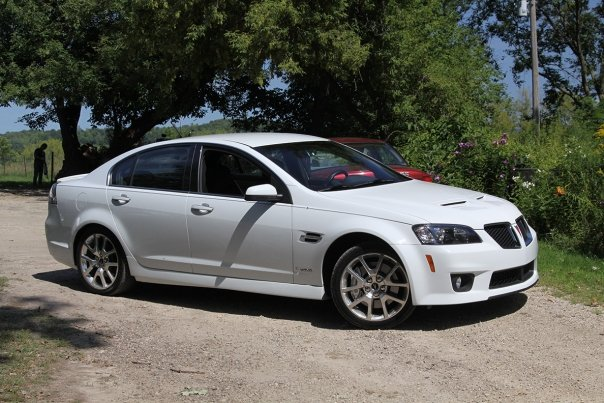
2009 Pontiac G8 GXP

A G8 GXP version was shown at the New York International Auto Show in March 2008 with a 6.2-liter 402 hp (300 kW) LS3 V8 and a six-speed manual transmission. The production version of the GXP was more powerful with its LS3 V8 producing 415 hp (309 kW) and 415 lb⋅ft (563 N⋅m) of torque. The six-speed automatic was standard while a six-speed Tremec TR-6060 manual transmission was available. The GXP reached 60 mph (97 km/h) from a standstill in 4.5 seconds, a quarter-mile time of 13.0 seconds at 109.6 mph (176.4 km/h), and 0.90g (8.8 m/s^{2}) of lateral acceleration on a skidpad.

The GXP has an upgraded, Nürburgring-tuned FE3 suspension package, as well as larger, ventilated Brembo disc brakes. It also features a unique front bumper cover and a rear (non-functional) diffuser to differentiate it from the standard Sedan and GT models.

Total sales of the Pontiac G8 GXP were 1,829 units. Only a limited production of G8 GXP were available in Canada. 10 units were shipped to Canada, however, only 4 were sold to customers. The remaining 6 were disposed of through GM's internal system.

In 2014, General Motors released the Chevrolet SS, which was in essence the next generation of the G8 GXP. It was based on the new VF chassis Holden Commodore, the successor to the VE chassis Commodore on which the G8 was based. Both the G8 GXP and the SS shared the same LS3 V8 engine, with the new SS sporting the engine with minor improvements. Horsepower for both remained 415, with 415 lb. ft. of torque.

=== Holden VE Commodore versions (2009) ===
Following the cancellation of Pontiac brand, it was reported that Holden planned to sell 1,500 limited-edition version of the Commodore SS V fitted with the Pontiac G8 front-end fascia and other trimmings. Unlike the G8, which was offered only as a sedan, Holden would be offering utility, sedan and wagon body variants of the G8. They would be sold in Australia in November and December, with production beginning on 2 November.

Production versions were sold as VE Commodore SS V-Series Special Edition (Sedan, Sportwagon) and as the Ute SS V-Series Special Edition, with the choice of manual or 6-speed automatic transmissions. SS V-Series Special Edition was unveiled at the 2009 Deniliquin Ute Muster. Production version for SS V-Series Special Edition went on sale in 2009–11.

== Cancelled body variants ==
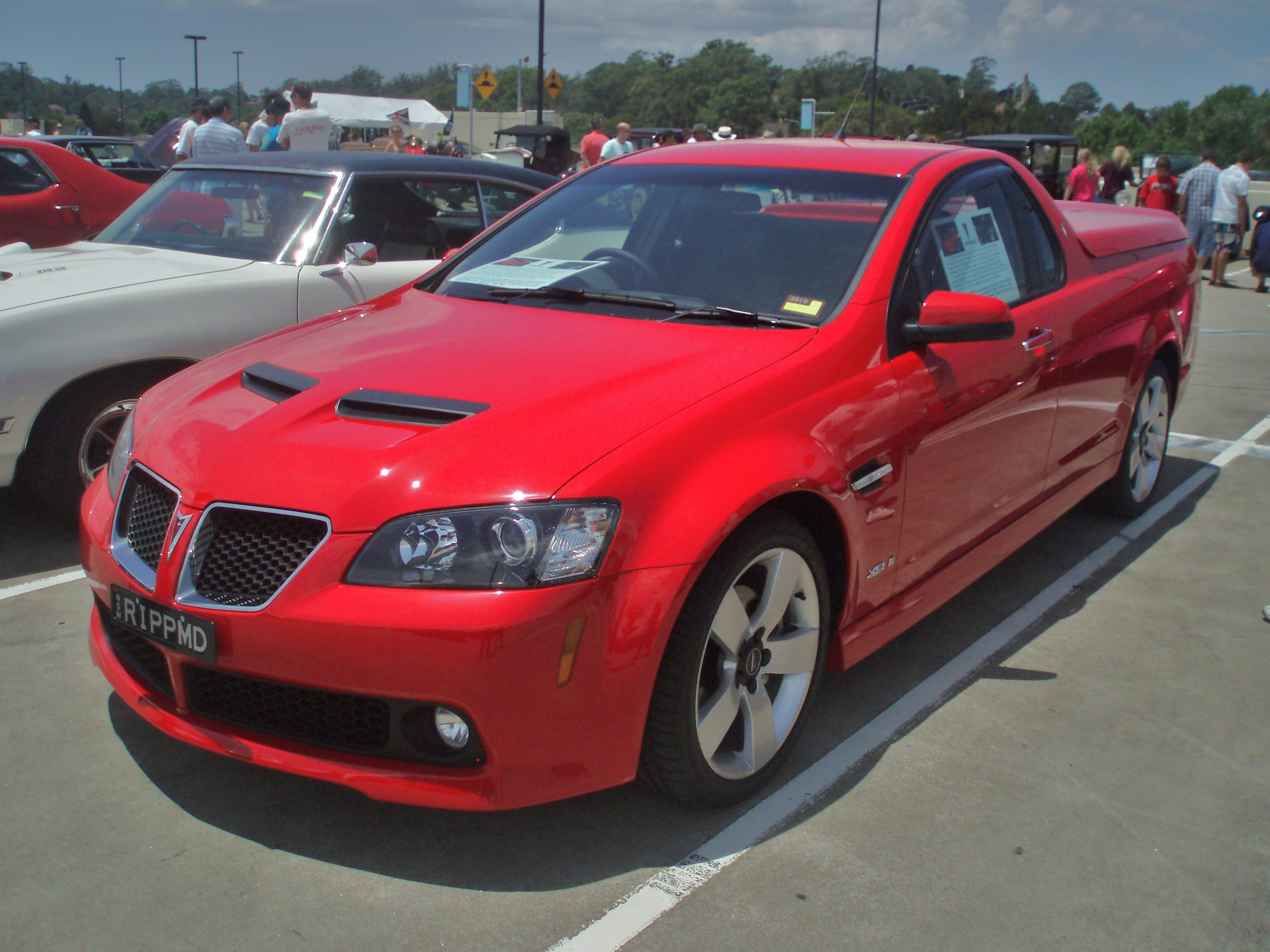
Holden SS Ute with Pontiac G8 front end conversion

=== G8 ST ===
In addition to the sedan, a two-seat coupé utility called the G8 ST (for Sport Truck) was shown at the New York International Auto Show in March 2008. Based on the Holden Ute, it was built on the same G8 platform with a 73-inch (1,900 mm) cargo bed. The ST had the same 361 hp (269 kW), 6.0-liter V8 used in the G8 GT, as well as the 3.6-liter, 256 hp (191 kW) V6. After a naming contest with more than 18,000 suggestions, the name remained the G8 ST.

The G8 ST, slated for release as a 2010 model, was to be Pontiac's first coupe utility, and GM's first coupe utility in the United States since the Chevrolet El Camino was discontinued in 1987. In January 2009, GM announced to Pontiac dealers that the G8 ST was cancelled due to budget cuts and restructuring.

=== G8 "Sportwagon" ===
A Pontiac variant of the VE Commodore Sportwagon station wagon was considered as well, but not imported, partially due to poor sales of the market in general, especially of the Dodge Magnum as compared to its Charger sedan counterpart. Unlike the G8 ST, the Sportwagon model was never announced by General Motors.

== Model years ==
=== 2008 ===
For the 2008 model year, the Pontiac G8 was initially offered in six colors: Stealth Blue, Liquid Red, Ignition Orange, White Hot, Magnetic Gray, and Panther Black. Stealth Blue was discontinued after the first batch of vehicles were shipped from Australia. First deliveries to dealerships were posted on GM's website in March 2008, with comments that initial sales were brisk. Subsequently, May 2008 monthly sales were reported at 1,832 units against a May 2007 sales volume of 12,230 units for the Grand Prix.

=== 2009 ===
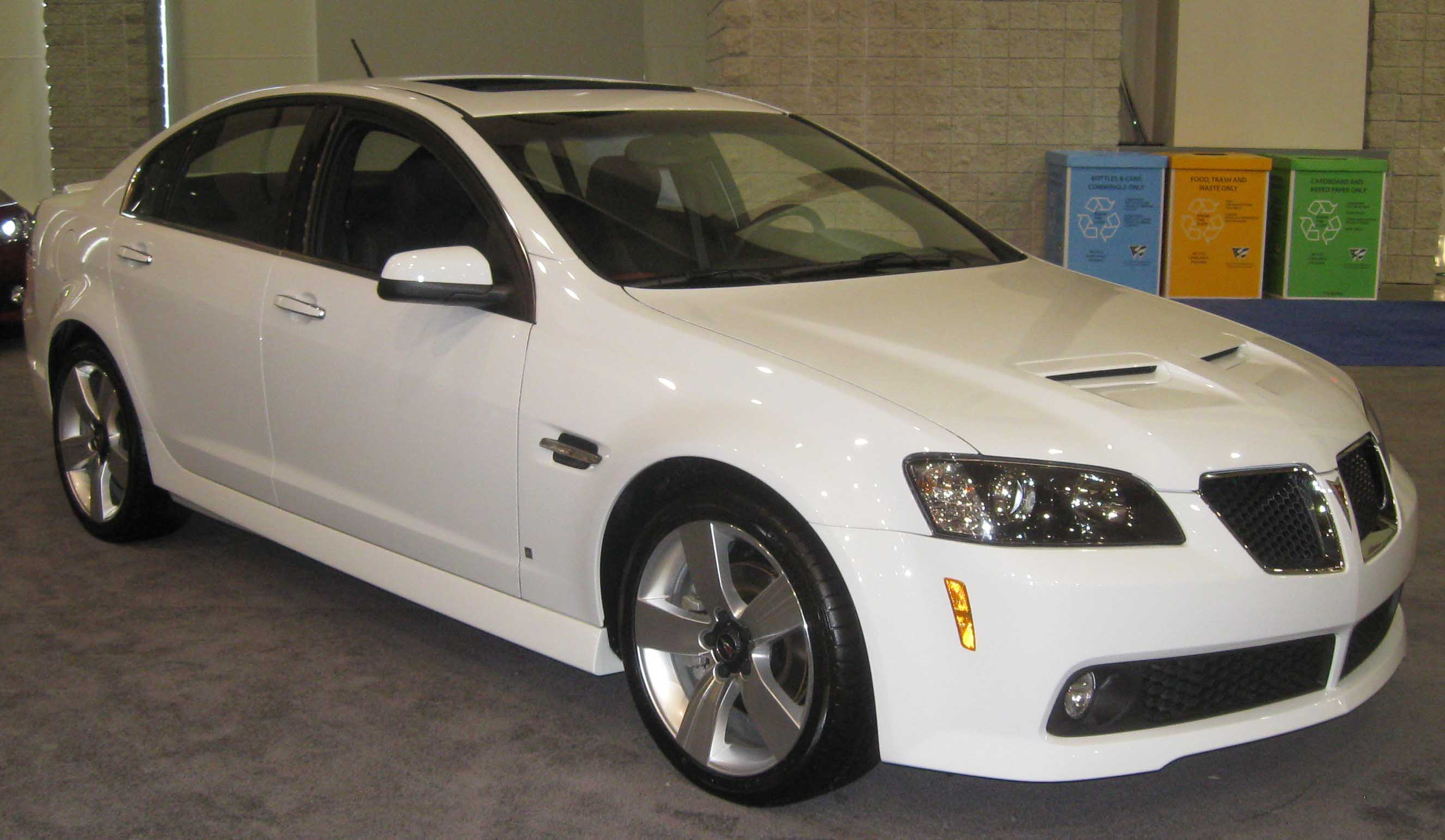
A 2009 Pontiac G8 GT

The 2009 model year adds the GXP version powered by a 415 hp (309 kW) 6.2-liter V8 engine with a standard 6-speed automatic transmission or optional six-speed manual transmission (see above). The GXP is available in all standard G8 colors.

The G8 lineup also adds standard XM Satellite Radio, with Bluetooth connectivity provided later in the year, and four new exterior color choices: Maverick Silver Metallic, Sport Red Metallic, Stryker Blue Metallic and Pacific Slate Metallic. Meanwhile, Stealth Blue and Ignition Orange were unavailable for 2009 (Stealth Blue having already been eliminated during 2008 model year production). For 2009, the oil pressure and battery voltage gauges at the top of the center console were eliminated. Criticism among the automotive press of the outdated appearance of the red LED gauges factored heavily in their removal. The gauges were replaced with a small storage compartment.

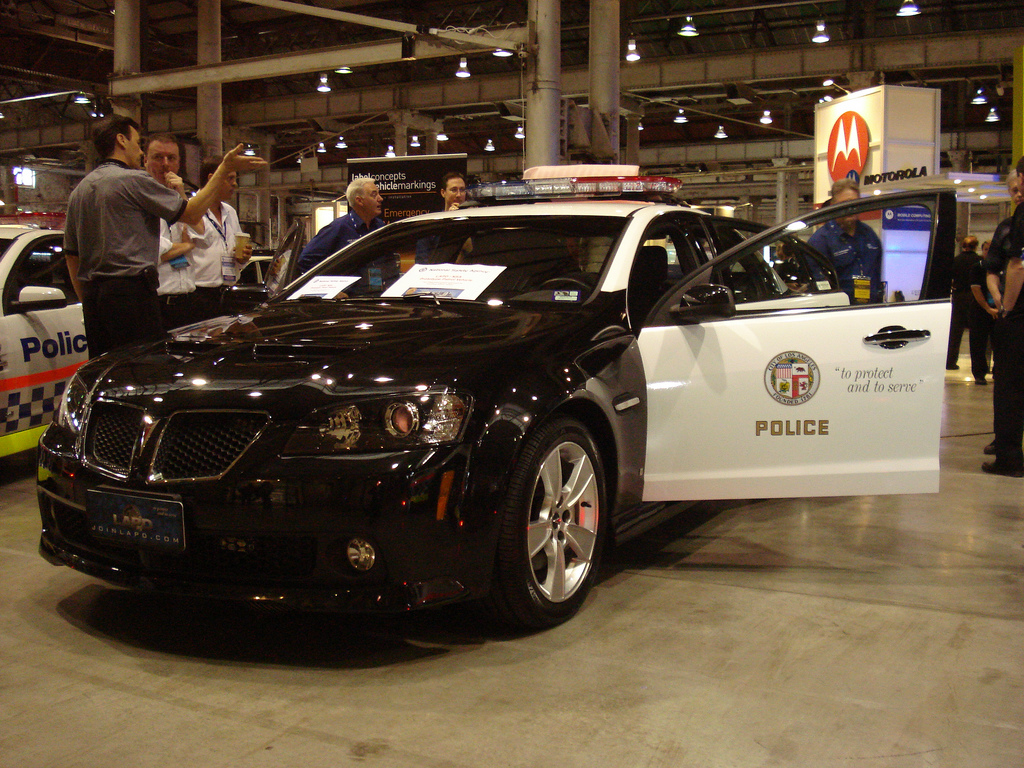
2009 LAPD Pontiac G8 Concept

National Safety Agency Ltd., an Australian company in a joint project with the Los Angeles Police Department (LAPD) displayed a prototype squad car based on the Pontiac G8, at the APCO 2009 Conference in Sydney in March 2009. The vehicle is fitted with a large portrait format touch screen in the center console, replacing the clutter of controls common in police vehicles.

== Safety ==
IIHS:
Head restraints & seats	Marginal

IIHS:
Head restraints & seats	Marginal

== Sales and marketing ==
Calendar year	Total sales (U.S.)
2008 (March–December)	15,002
2009	23,157

=== Marketing ===
General Motors heavily promoted the Pontiac G8 on 31 December 2007 into 1 January 2008, by having it as the official sponsor of the Times Square New Year's Eve Ball Drop and Countdown, as well as the Rose Bowl.

The G8 is the primary vehicle in the 2009 driving game, Wheelman.

In March 2008, a commercial based on the 1980s arcade game Spy Hunter ran nationally. In the commercial, the Pontiac G8 GT takes the place of the hero car when it is destroyed by enemies.
