= Chevrolet SS =

American full-size performance sedan

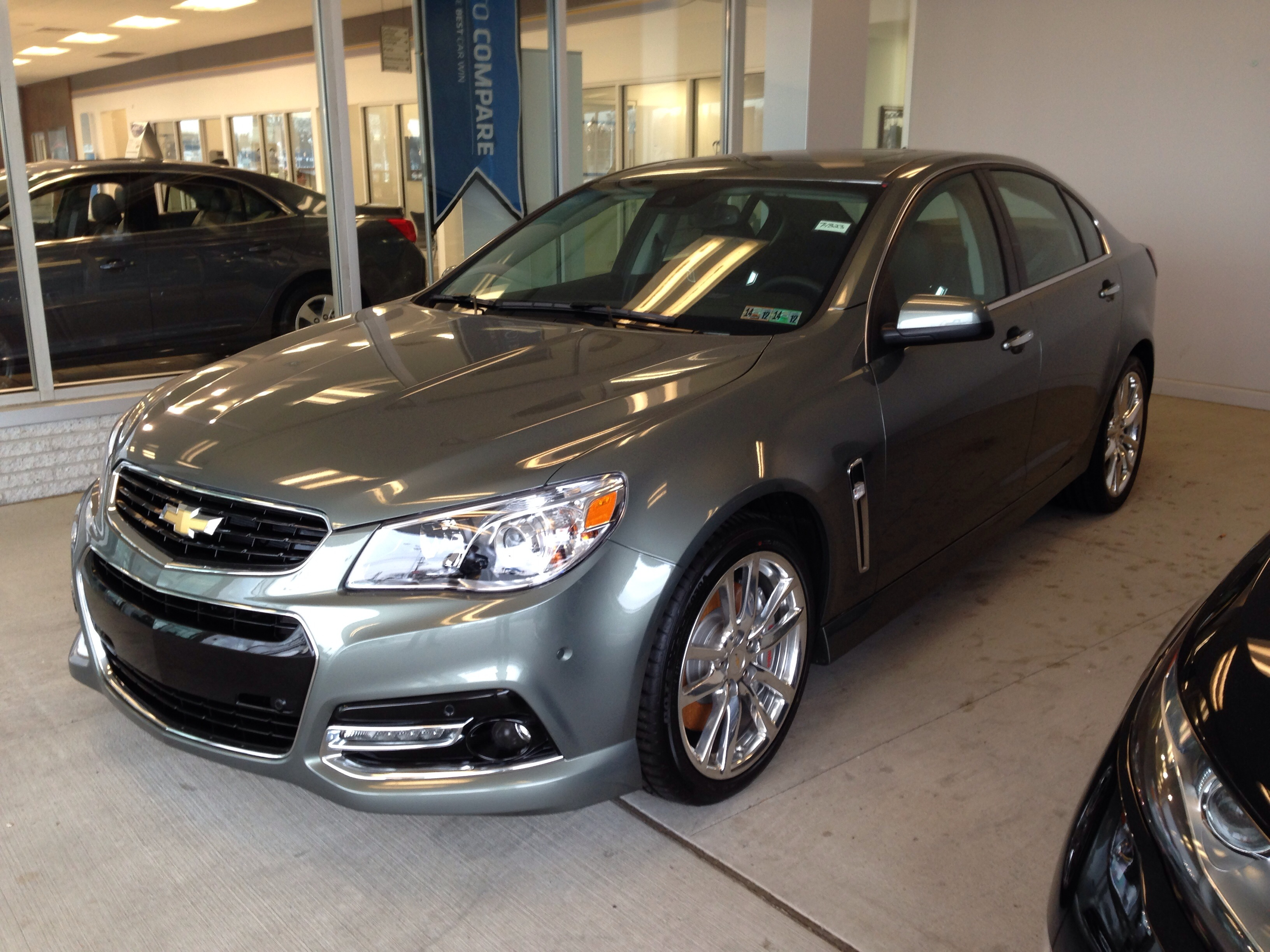
- 2014 Chevrolet SS

Overview
- Manufacturer: Holden (General Motors)
- Also called: Holden Commodore (VF)
- Production: 2013–2017
- Model years: 2014–2017
- Assembly: Australia: Adelaide (Elizabeth Plant)

Body and chassis
- Class: Full-size car
- Body style: 4-door sedan
- Layout: Front-engine, rear-wheel-drive
- Platform: GM Zeta platform
- Related: Chevrolet Caprice; Chevrolet Camaro (fifth generation); Holden Caprice (WN)

Powertrain
- Engine: 6.2 L LS3 V8
- Power output: 415 hp (309 kW; 421 PS)
- Transmission: 6-speed 6L80-E automatic 6-speed Tremec TR-6060 manual

Dimensions
- Wheelbase: 114.8 in (2,916 mm)
- Length: 195.8 in (4,973 mm)
- Width: 74.8 in (1,900 mm)
- Height: 57.7 in (1,466 mm)
- Curb weight: 3,946 lb (1,790 kg)

Chronology
- Predecessor: Pontiac G8

The Chevrolet SS is a performance full-size sedan sold by Chevrolet from 2013 to 2017, as a rebadge of the Holden Commodore exclusive to the United States. It was sold in the 2014–2017 model years.

It was unveiled during Speedweeks in Daytona Beach, Florida, in February 2013. The SS started sale in the 2014 model year in late 2013. It was Chevrolet's first rear-wheel drive V8 sedan since 1996.

== Overview ==
The Chevrolet SS was powered by a 6.2-liter LS3 V8 engine, with power and torque outputs of 415 hp (309 kW) and 415 lb⋅ft (563 N⋅m). The only available transmission for model year 2014 was a six-speed automatic that could be shifted manually using paddle shifters on the steering wheel. Top speed was governor-limited to 160 mph. In November 2013 Car and Driver magazine reported the SS accelerated from 0-60 mph (97 km/h) in 4.5 seconds and completed the 1/4 mile in 12.9 seconds at 111 mph (179 km/h).

Compared to the preceding Pontiac G8, the restyled SS featured a stiffer chassis for improved ride and handling thanks to greater use of medium to high-strength steels adopted for the updated VF Commodore. The addition of high-grade steels resulted in 30 pounds shaved off the core structure. Crash performance was also improved thanks to redesigned front rails and the electrical architecture was re-engineered from the ground up allowing for technologies such as head up display and active safety systems (e.g. blind spot monitors).

The Chevrolet SS had a single, fully equipped specification level, with two optional extras: a sunroof and a full-size spare tire. The SS came with Chevrolet's MyLink system (including Bluetooth, Sirius XM Radio, and Pandora Radio features) and, like the VF Commodore, had auto-park assist, a blind-spot monitoring system, a lane departure warning system and electronic power steering. The SS was fitted with 19-inch wheels.

On 7 June 2013 Holden began touting the VF Commodore and its ties to the Chevrolet SS in a series of new television commercials which were released online.

On 20 February 2013 GM announced that the Chevrolet SS would not be sold in Canada, despite having been previewed there days before the February 2013 Canadian International Auto Show in Toronto.

On 6 September 2013, Chevrolet announced that the number of Chevrolet SS vehicles are limited to selected Chevrolet dealerships based on their sales of the Corvette C7 and Camaro, claiming that the allocation might have more to do with production rather than supply and demand. Chevrolet projected about 2,000 to 3,000 vehicles a year instead of the much speculated 15,000 to 20,000 cited in the media.

On 30 July 2014, Chevrolet announced that the SS would become the first vehicle in the brand's lineup to feature an automatic parking assist system. Chevrolet added the option of a manual transmission, standard Magnetic Ride Control (MRC) and OnStar's 4G LTE service to the 2015 model, which debuted at the Woodward Dream Cruise in August 2014.

== 2016 facelift ==
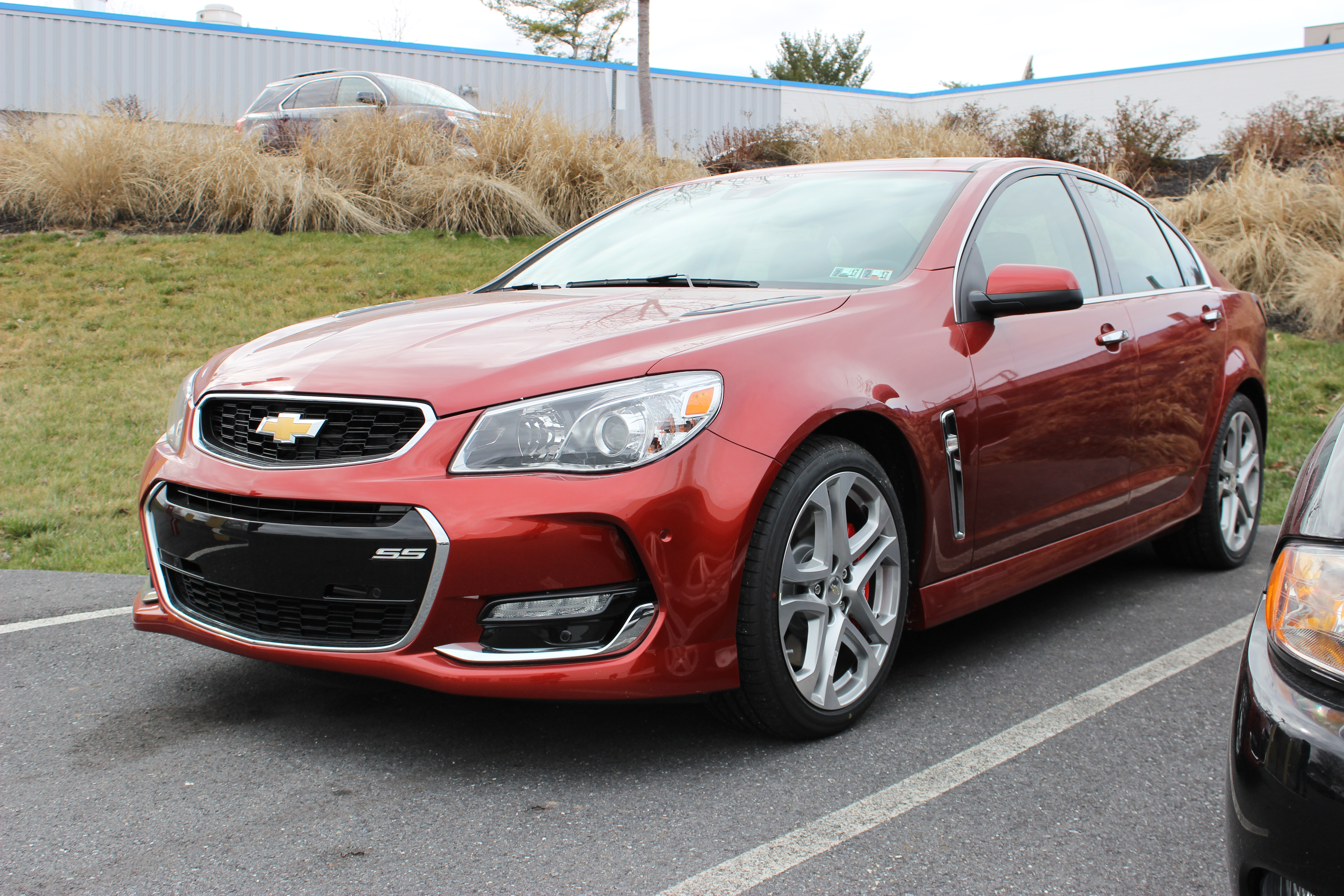
Chevrolet SS (2016 model year facelift)

For the 2016 model, Chevrolet announced that the SS would receive a facelifted design, akin to that of the Holden Commodore (VF) Series II. The facelift brought new front and rear fascias, revised LED lighting, dual mode exhaust system with quad exhaust tips, functional hood vents, a new "Slipstream Blue" paint color (replacing "Perfect Blue" and "Alchemy Purple Metallic"), red Brembo brake calipers and an updated wheel design (with cast aluminum construction, as opposed to the forged aluminum wheels used previously).

For the 2017 model year, three exterior colors were removed (Some Like It Hot Red metallic, Jungle Green metallic, and Mystic Green metallic) and two colors were added: Orange Blast and Nightfall Gray Metallic. This was also the final model year of the SS, as Chevrolet announced on 9 January 2017 that Holden was to end the production of the Commodore in Australia without any plans for a successor.

== Sales figures ==
SS Sales in the United States
	Jan	Feb	Mar	Apr	May	Jun	Jul	Aug	Sep	Oct	Nov	Dec	Year	Total
2013	—N/a									1	178	239	418	12,860
2014	232	283	350	283	297	217	241	152	111	115	105	93	2,479	12,860
2015	115	215	264	299	287	354	321	344	222	192	148	134	2,895	12,860
2016	88	165	286	592	228	254	521	14	5	554	212	94	3,013	12,860
2017	64	248	1,217	250	247	298	259	227	171	150	882	42	4,055	12,860

== Gallery ==
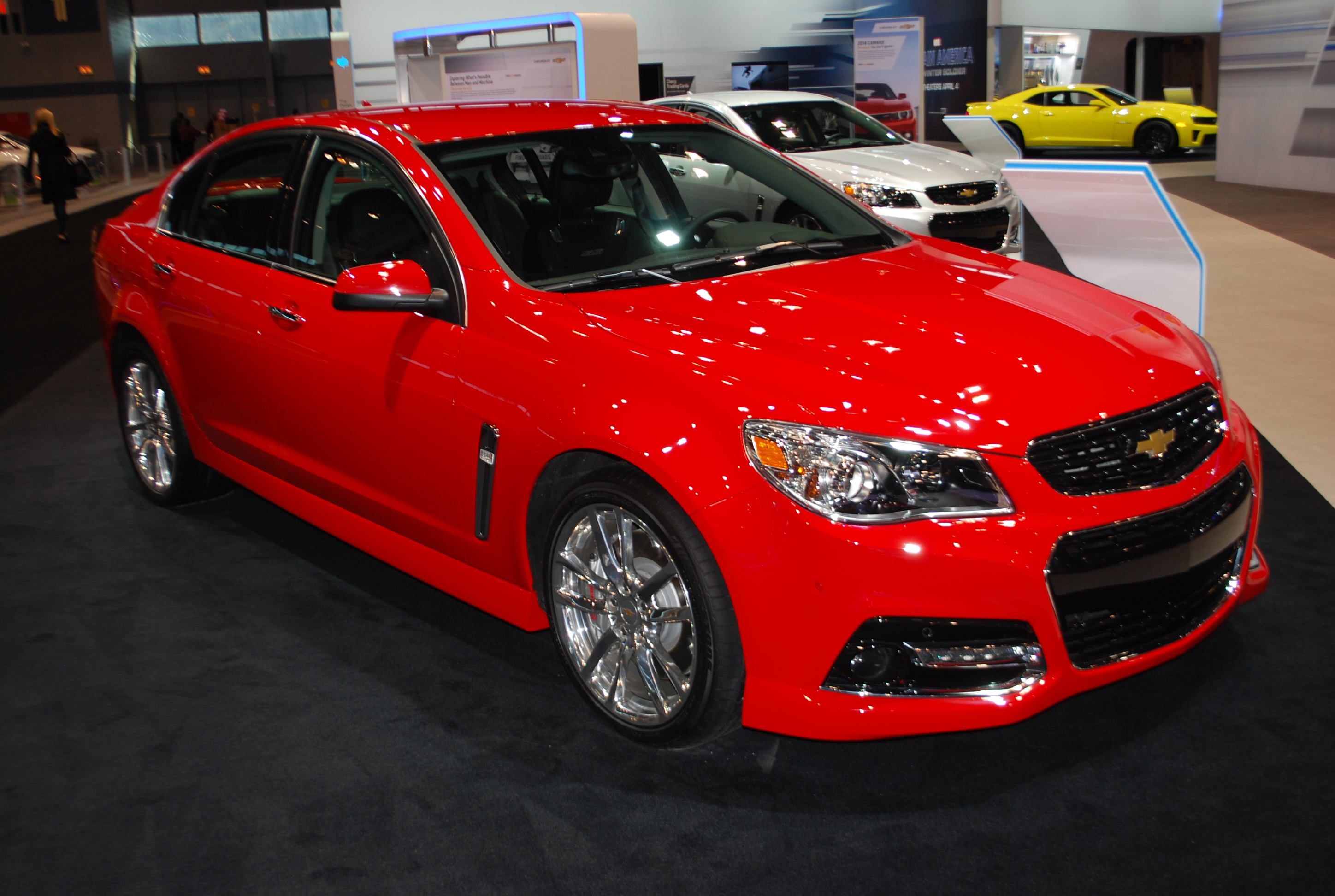
Chevrolet SS (pre-facelift)

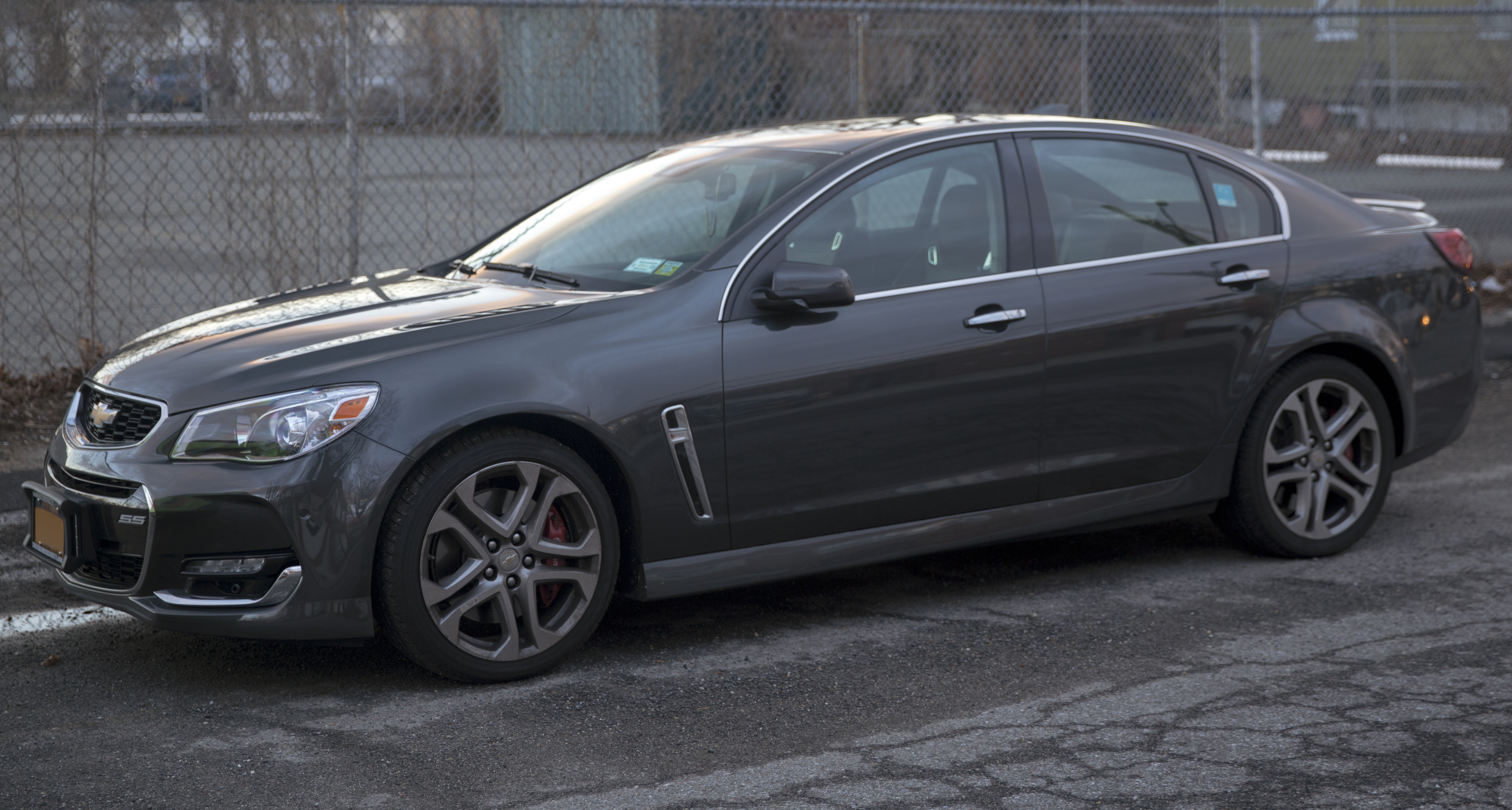
Chevrolet SS (facelift) front view

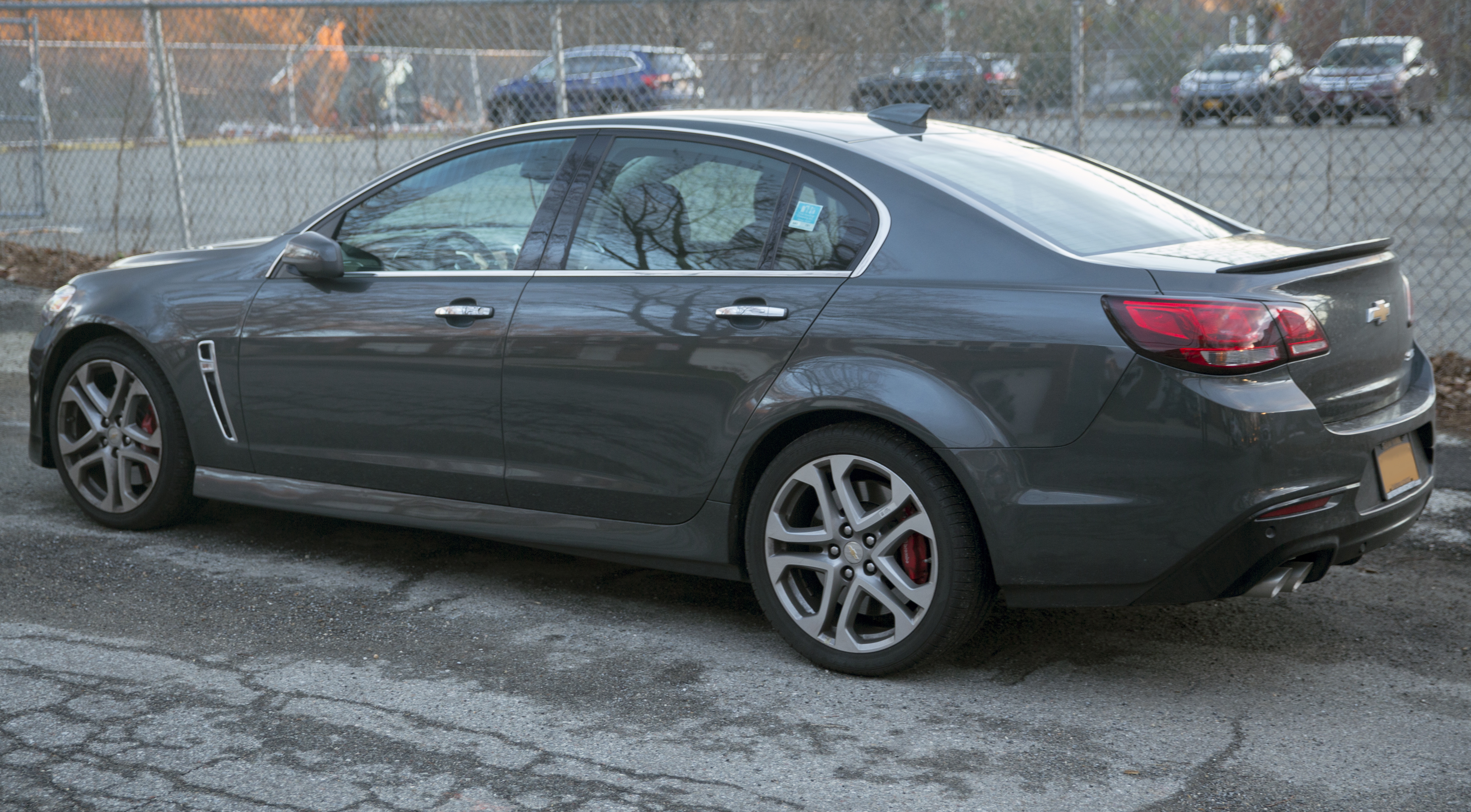
Chevrolet SS (facelift) rear view

== NASCAR ==
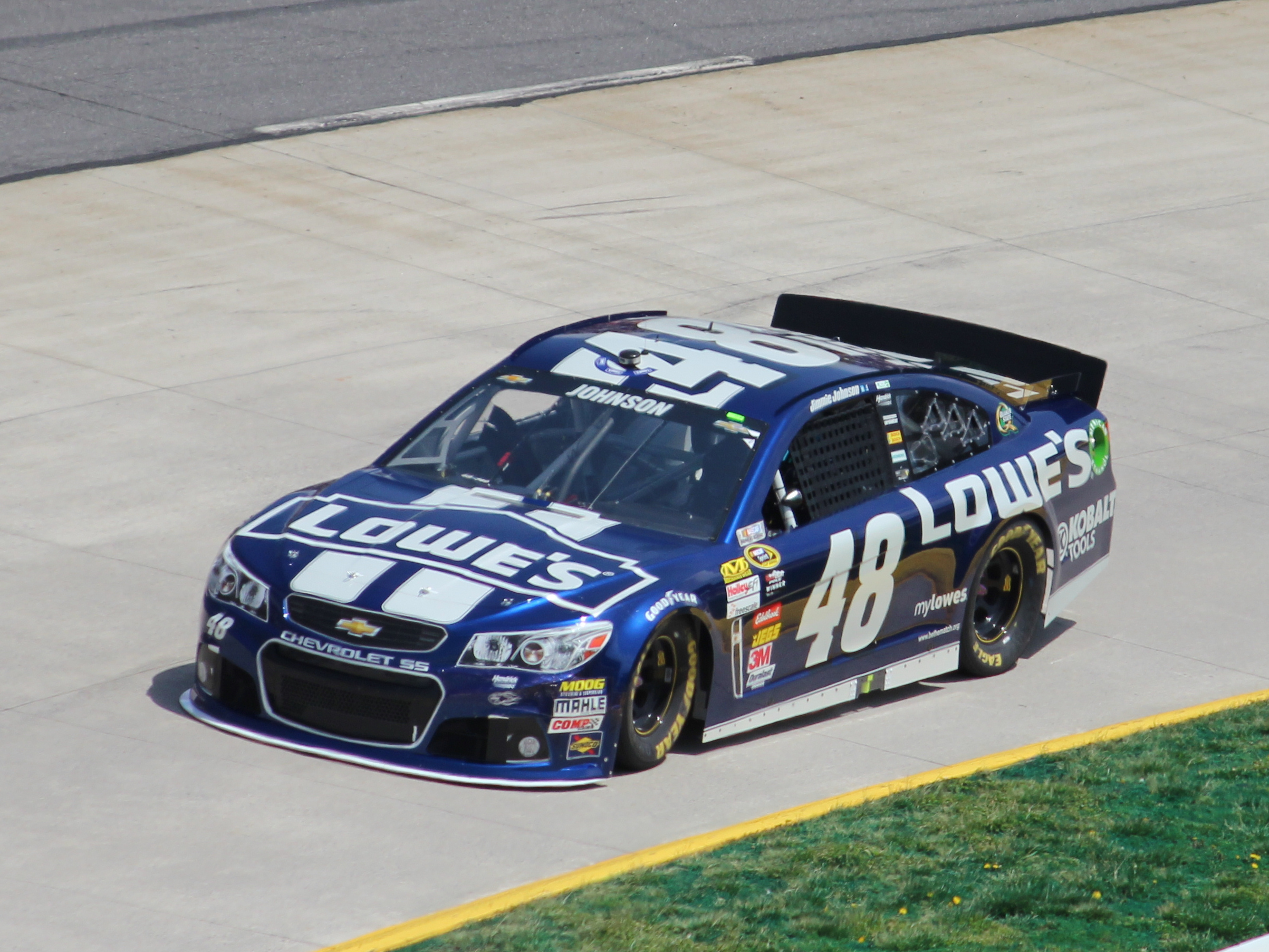
Chevrolet SS NASCAR Sprint Cup Series car, driven by Jimmie Johnson at Martinsville Speedway during the 2013 STP Gas Booster 500.

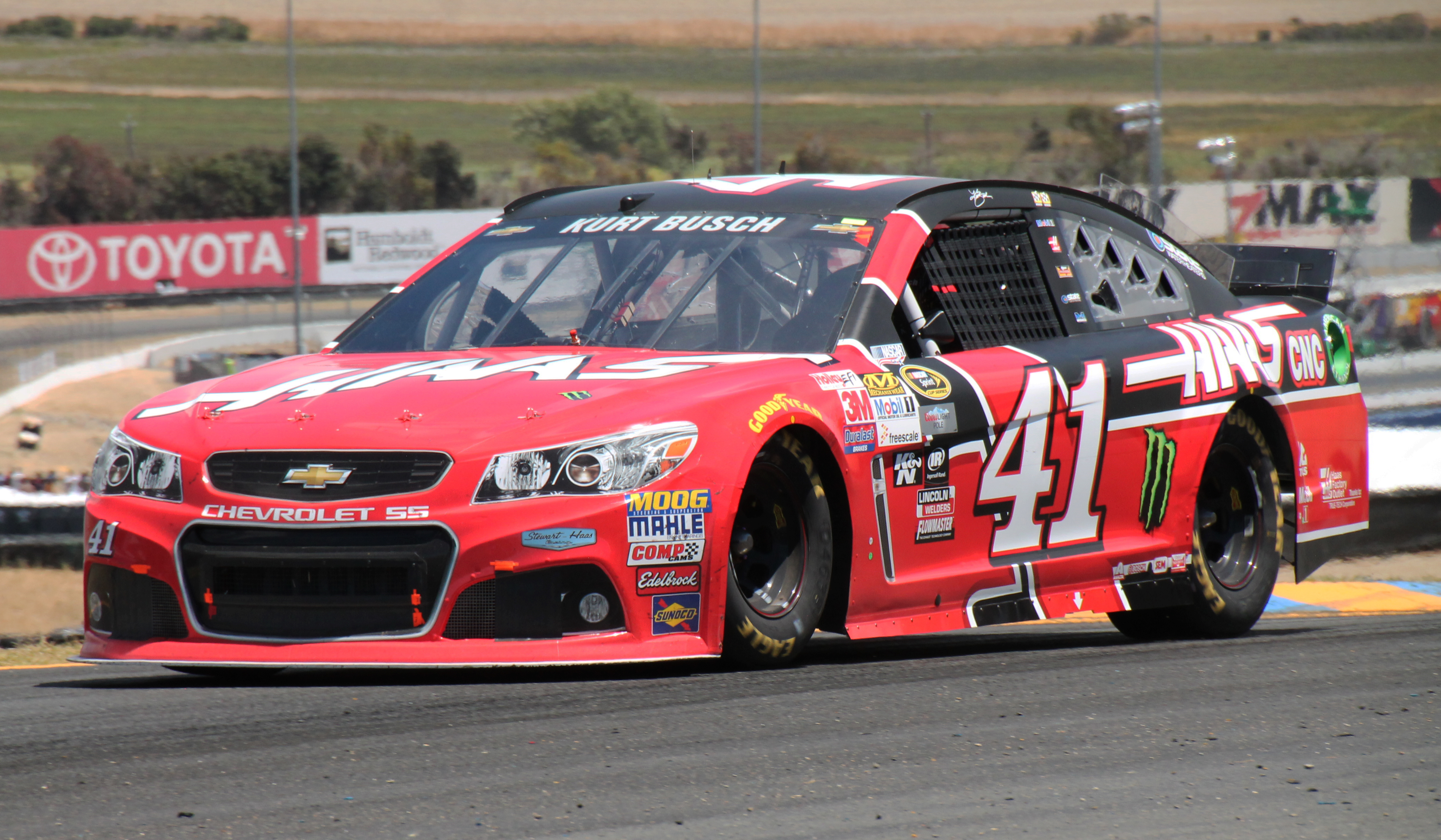
Chevrolet SS NASCAR Sprint Cup Series car, driven by Kurt Busch at Sonoma Raceway, during the 2015 Toyota/Save Mart 350.

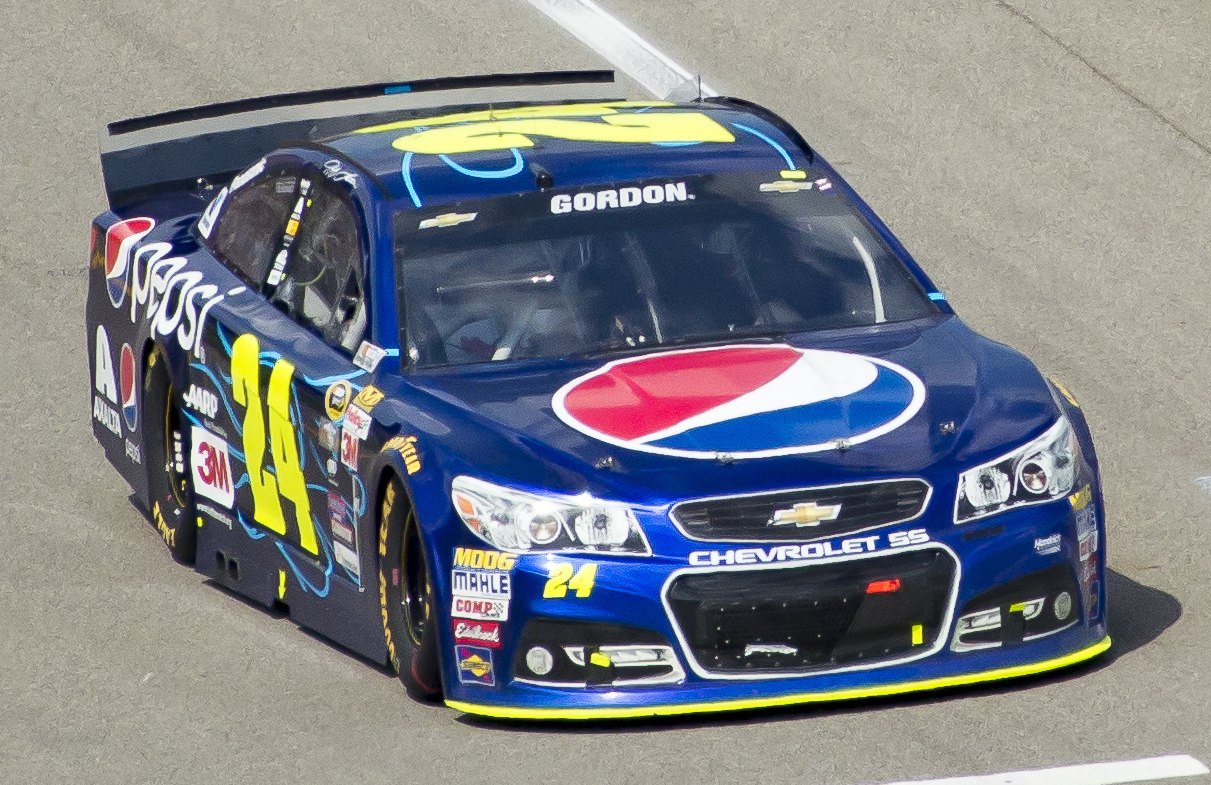
Chevrolet SS NASCAR Sprint Cup Series car, driven by Jeff Gordon at Michigan International Speedway.

Chevrolet begin to compete with the SS in the Monster Energy NASCAR Cup Series, which having made a spectacular debut during the Sprint Unlimited non-championship race in 2013. Kevin Harvick won the race in the car's first season. It was one of the new Generation 6 vehicles, replacing the Car of Tomorrow Impala SS. Jimmie Johnson gave the SS a winning claim at the 2013 Daytona 500 after Danica Patrick took pole in her SS.

Like its Commodore counterpart in V8 Supercars, the SS won the NASCAR Sprint Cup manufacturers' championship with three rounds remaining. Johnson went on to win the title in his SS. In 2014, the SS again won the Sprint Cup Series championship this time being driven by Kevin Harvick. In 2016 Jimmie Johnson won the Sprint Cup Series championship in an SS for the seventh time, tying the all-time record with Richard Petty and Dale Earnhardt.

For the 2018 Monster Energy NASCAR Cup season, the SS was replaced by the smaller Chevrolet Camaro ZL1, which is the brand's first coupe-based entry since the Monte Carlo was discontinued after the 2007 model year.
