= Lansing Grand River Assembly =

General Motors assembly plant in Michigan, U.S.

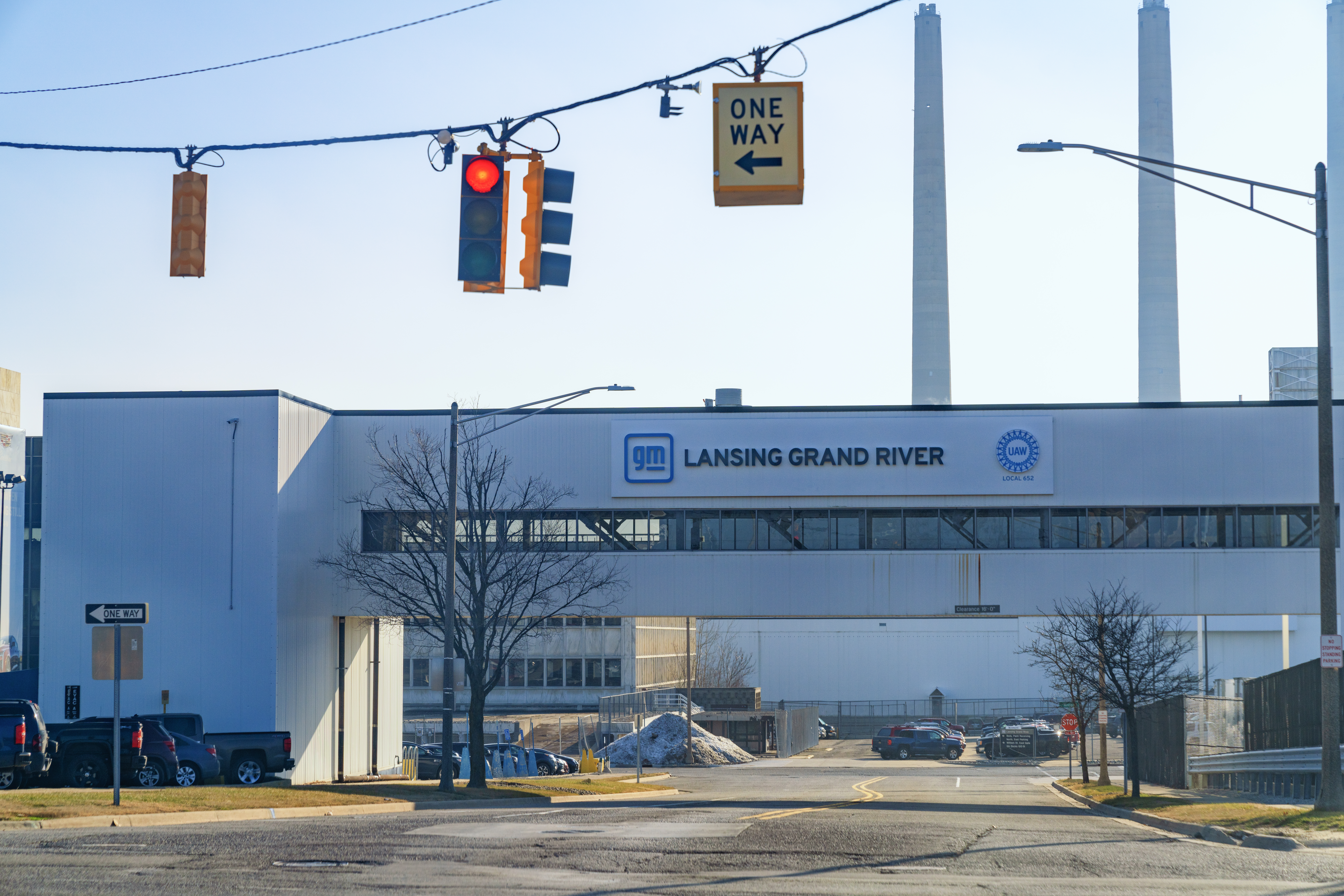
- Built: 1999
- Operated: 2001–present
- Location: 920 Townsend Street; Lansing, Michigan, United States
- Coordinates: 42°43′22″N 84°33′42″W
- Industry: Automotive
- Products: Automobiles
- Employees: 1,485 (2022)
- Area: 111 acres (0.45 km^{2})
- Volume: 3,400,000 sq ft (320,000 m^{2})
- Website: gm.com/lansing-grand-river

Lansing Grand River Assembly (LGR) is an automotive assembly plant in Lansing, Michigan, United States, owned and operated by General Motors. It currently assembles the CT5 luxury sedan for the North American market.

The Lansing Grand River Assembly facility includes a body shop, paint shop, general assembly and central utilities complex.

== History ==
The Lansing Grand River Assembly complex began construction in 1999 and began operations in 2001. It replaced the Lansing Car Assembly, Lansing Metal Center, and the Lansing Craft Center. On September 16, 2013, Lansing Grand River Assembly Plant had produced its 1 millionth Cadillac vehicle, a 2014 Cadillac CTS sedan with Red Obsession Tintcoat body color.

== Vehicles produced ==
=== Current ===
As of June 2026:

- Cadillac CT5/CT5-V

=== Former ===
- Cadillac ATS
- Cadillac ATS-V
- Cadillac CTS
- Cadillac CTS-V
- Cadillac SRX
- Cadillac STS
- Cadillac STS-V
- Chevrolet Camaro
- Cadillac CT4/CT4-V
