= Tremec TR-6060 transmission =

Six-speed manual transmission

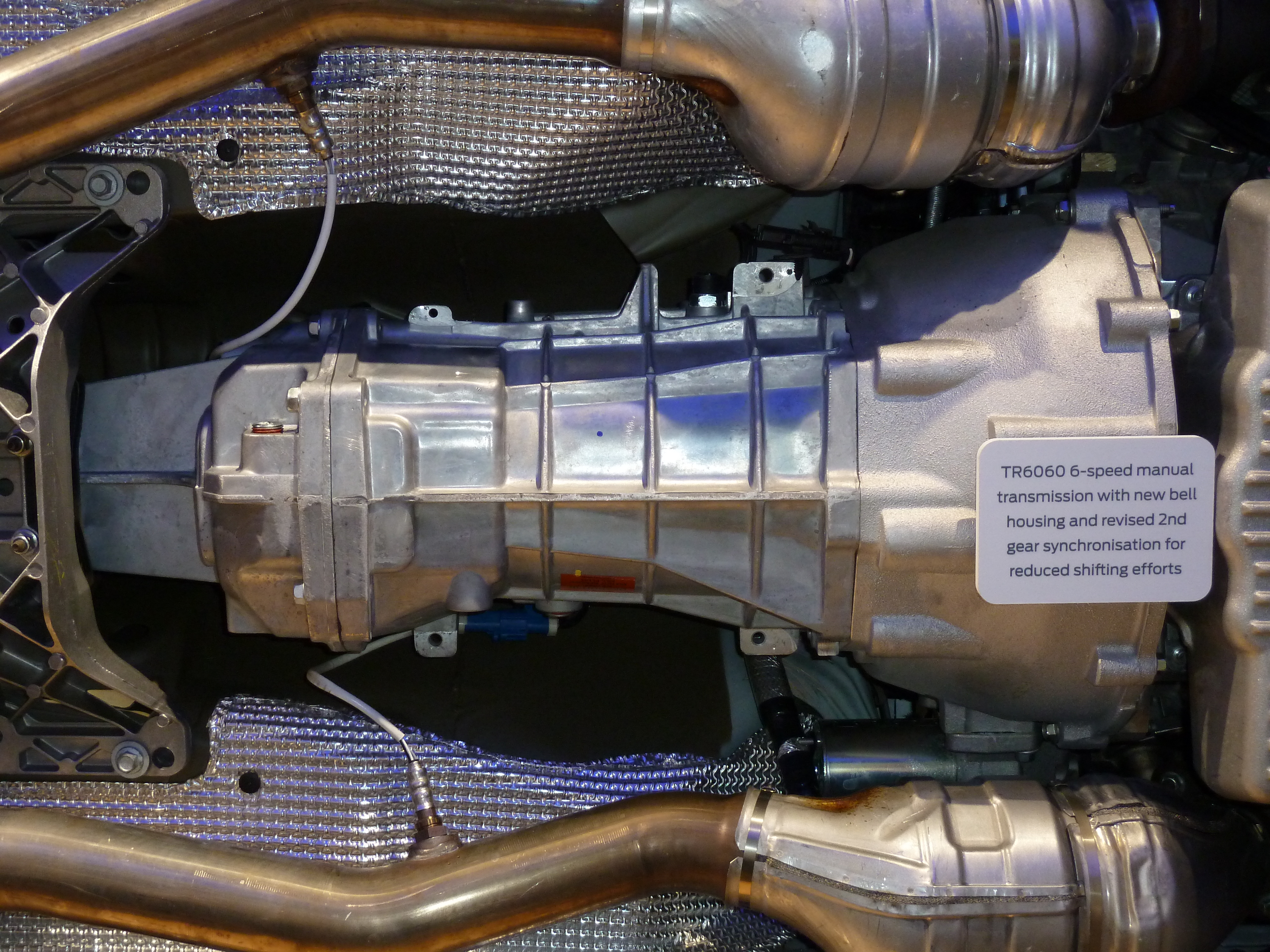
Tremec TR-6060 transmission

The Tremec TR-6060 six-speed manual transmission features six forward speeds and one reverse speed. It is derived from the Tremec T-56 six-speed manual transmission designed by BorgWarner. As usual, the forward helical-cut gears are synchronized. However, the reverse gear operates through a fully synchronized constant-mesh system. The TR-6060 contains removable wear pads on the shift forks and uses aluminum alloys for the main case, extension housing, and clutch housing. It is a double overdrive transmission. The TR-6060 is manufactured by TREMEC (formerly Transmission Technologies Corporation) and is rated for 430 lb⋅ft (580 N⋅m) to 650 lb⋅ft (880 N⋅m) of torque, depending on gearing.

TREMEC also sells the Magnum, Magnum-F, and Magnum-XL versions for aftermarket applications.

== Changes from T-56 6-speed ==
The FG Falcon launch documentation describes the new gearbox: "The new synchronizer package features triple synchromesh on first and second gears and double synchromesh on all other gears, including reverse, which has significantly reduced gear shift efforts and shift travel.

The reduced shift travel provided by the synchroniser package has also allowed increased space for the use of larger gears, which are stronger to deliver improved torque capacity and gearbox durability. A new single-piece countershaft also contributes to the greater torque capacity and durability enhancements.

Other features of the new TR-6060 transmission include:

- Reduced friction in the shifter system courtesy of a new cam and anti-friction plunger to control the side load shift detents.
- Forward and rearward shift detent grooves are broached on the front of the main-shaft with a spring-loaded anti-friction roller for more precise control of shift detents and positive shift feel.
- Anti-friction ball struts, sintered hubs, and fine-pitch splines on all synchronizers for reduced friction between components, delivering improved shift feel and reduced shift efforts.
- Wider, two-piece gears with machined clutch teeth for more precise gear engagement and reduced potential for gear block-outs."

== Lubrication ==
General Motors uses Texaco ATF Type III 1863 fluid and is certified "fill-for-life," requiring no fluid changes. Ford US lists a fill specification of 3.65 quarts of Mercon-V automatic transmission fluid. FCA applications use Mopar ATF+4 automatic transmission fluid.

== Applications ==
- 2007-2009 Ford Mustang Shelby GT500
- 2008–2013 Chevrolet Corvette
- 2008-2017 Dodge Viper
- 2008–2016 Ford Falcon
- 2008–2017 Holden Special Vehicles Range
- 2009–2023 Dodge Challenger
- 2009 Pontiac G8 GXP
- 2009–2015 Cadillac CTS-V
- 2010-2014 Ford Shelby GT500
- 2010–2024 Chevrolet Camaro SS
- 2012–2024 Chevrolet Camaro ZL1
- 2013–2017 Gen-F HSV
- 2015–2017 Chevrolet SS
- 2016–2019 Cadillac ATS-V
- 2022–present Cadillac CT4-V Blackwing
- 2022–present Cadillac CT5-V Blackwing

Model	1st	2nd	3rd	4th	5th	6th	Reverse
2007-2010 Ford Mustang Shelby GT500	2.97	1.78	1.30	1.00	0.80	0.63	2.90
2008 Ford Falcon Ute & XR6	3.36	2.07	1.35	1.00	0.71	0.57	3.28
2008 Ford Falcon XR6 Turbo & XR8	2.98	1.78	1.30	1.00	0.71	0.55	2.90
2008-2013 Holden Commodore HSV E Series	3.01	2.07	1.43	1.00	0.84	0.57	3.28
2008–2013 Chevrolet Corvette	2.66	1.78	1.30	1.00	0.74	0.50	2.90
2008–2009 Chevrolet Corvette Z51	2.97	2.07	1.43	1.00	0.71	0.57	3.28
2009-2023 Dodge Challenger 5.7/6.1/6.4	2.97	2.10	1.46	1.00	0.74	0.50	3.28
2015-2923 Dodge Challenger Hellcat	2.26	1.58	1.19	1.00	0.76	0.63	2.90
2009 Pontiac G8 GXP	2.97	2.10	1.46	1.00	0.71	0.56	3.28
2009–2013 Cadillac CTS-V	2.66	1.78	1.30	1.00	0.80	0.63	2.90
2010-2015 Chevrolet Camaro SS	3.01	2.07	1.43	1.00	0.84	0.57	3.28
2012–2015 Chevrolet Camaro ZL1	2.66	1.78	1.30	1.00	0.80	0.63	2.90
2016-2024 Chevrolet Camaro SS	2.66	1.78	1.30	1.00	0.74	0.50	2.90
2011-2012 Ford Mustang Shelby GT500	2.97	1.78	1.30	1.00	0.74	0.50	3.98
2013-2014 Ford Mustang Shelby GT500	2.66	1.82	1.30	1.00	0.77	0.50	3.98
2013–2016 SRT/Dodge Viper	2.26	1.58	1.19	1.00	0.77	0.63	2.90
2015–2017 Chevrolet SS	3.01	2.07	1.43	1.00	0.71	0.57	3.28
2016–2017 Cadillac ATS-V	2.66	1.78	1.30	1.00	0.79	0.63	2.93
2009-2013 Chevrolet Corvette ZR1	2.29	1.61	1.21	1.00	0.82	0.68	3.11
2022-present Cadillac CT4-V Blackwing	2.66	1.78	1.30	1.00	0.80	0.63	2.90
2022-present Cadillac CT5-V Blackwing	2.29	1.61	1.21	1.00	0.82	0.54	3.11
