= Borg-Warner T-56 transmission =

Six-speed manual transmission

The T-56 six speed manual transmission has been used in a wide range of vehicles from General Motors, Dodge, and Ford Motor Company. The transmission was originally designed and built by BorgWarner for the Dodge Viper later being used by GM in 1992 for the generation II and later engines, but from 1998 was built by Tremec, after they purchased BorgWarner's manual transmission business. The T-56 has been succeeded by the Tremec TR-6060 transmission in many former T-56 applications, as well as applications requiring greater strength than the T-56 could offer.

== Applications ==
- Aston Martin DB7 Vantage, 1999–2003
- Aston Martin V12 Vanquish, 2001–2006
- Chevrolet Corvette, 1997–2007
- Chevrolet Camaro Z28/SS, 1993–2002
- Pontiac Firebird Formula/Trans Am,1993–2002
- Dodge Ram SRT10, 2004–2006
- Dodge Viper, 1992–2007
- Ford Mustang Cobra, 2003–2004
- Ford Mustang Cobra R, 2000
- Ford Falcon XR8, 2002–2005
- FPV F6 Tornado/Typhoon, GT/GT-P, 2004–2008
- General Motors GM F platform V8 cars, 1993–2002
- Holden Commodore SV8/SS, 1994–2008
- Holden Monaro CV8, 2001–2006
- GM M12
  - 2001–2004 Chevrolet Corvette Z06
  - 2004–2006 Pontiac GTO
  - 2004–2007 Cadillac CTS-V
- GM MN6
  - 2004–2007 Chevrolet Corvette
- GM M10
  - 2005–2006 Chevrolet SSR
  - 2006–2008 Holden VE Commodore
- GM MZ6
  - 2005–2007 Chevrolet Corvette Z51

== Features ==
The transmission uses a hydraulic clutch, except for the Cobra which was mechanical. The Cobra had an 11-inch clutch disc. The entire case, including the bell housing, is made of aluminum. The T-56 has a synchromesh made up of brass synchros for the GM and Ford applications, and stainless steel in the Dodge application. The transmission also features internal stops which render stopbolts on the shifter mechanism unnecessary.

== Identification ==
Tag ID	Application	Torque Rating (lb.ft)	1st	2nd	3rd	4th	5th	6th	Rev	Input Splines	Output Splines
1386-000-003	1992 Dodge Viper	330	2.66:1	1.78:1	1.30:1	1.00:1	0.74:1	0.50:1	2.90:1	26	30
1386-000-005	1993–1995 Dodge Viper	550	2.66:1	1.78:1	1.30:1	1.00:1	0.74:1	0.50:1	2.90:1	26	30
1386-000-006	1993 Camaro/Firebird w/2.73 final drive "M28"	350	3.36:1	2.07:1	1.35:1	1.00:1	0.80:1	0.62:1	3.28:1	26	27
1386-000-007	1993 Camaro/Firebird w/3.23 final drive "M29"	400	2.97:1	2.07:1	1.43:1	1.00:1	0.80:1	0.62:1	3.28:1	26	27
1386-000-009	1994–1995 Camaro/Firebird	450	2.66:1	1.78:1	1.30:1	1.00:1	0.74:1	0.50:1	2.90:1	26	27
1386-000-011	GM Aftermarket	450	2.97:1	2.07:1	1.43:1	1.00:1	0.80:1	0.62:1	3.28:1	26	27
1386-000-012	Mustang 5.0 Aftermarket	450	2.97:1	2.07:1	1.43:1	1.00:1	0.80:1	0.62:1	3.28:1	10	31
1386-000-013	Holden	450	2.66:1	1.78:1	1.30:1	1.00:1	0.74:1	0.50:1	2.90:1	26	27
1386-000-014	1996–2002 Dodge Viper		2.66:1	1.78:1	1.30:1	1.00:1	0.74:1	0.50:1	2.90:1	26	30
1386-000-016	1996–1997 Camaro/Firebird	450	2.66:1	1.78:1	1.30:1	1.00:1	0.74:1	0.50:1	2.90:1	26	27
1386-000-017	1998 Camaro/Firebird	450	2.66:1	1.78:1	1.30:1	1.00:1	0.74:1	0.50:1	2.90:1	26	27
1386-000-018	1996–2002 Dodge Viper	450	2.66:1	1.78:1	1.30:1	1.00:1	0.74:1	0.50:1	2.90:1	26	30
1386-000-019		390	2.66:1	1.78:1	1.30:1	1.00:1	0.74:1	0.50:1	2.90:1		
1386-000-020	1999–2002 Camaro/Firebird	450	2.66:1	1.78:1	1.30:1	1.00:1	0.74:1	0.50:1	2.90:1	26	27
1386-000-021	Aston Martin	450	2.66:1	1.78:1	1.30:1	1.00:1	0.79:1	0.63:1	2.90:1	26	30
1386-000-022	Holden Commodore	350	2.66:1	1.78:1	1.30:1	1.00:1	0.74:1	0.50:1	2.90:1	26	27
1386-000-023	Corvette C5 (MM6)	375	2.66:1	1.78:1	1.30:1	1.00:1	0.74:1	0.50:1	2.90:1	26	27
1386-000-024		375	2.66:1	1.78:1	1.30:1	1.00:1	0.74:1	0.50:1	2.90:1		
1386-000-025	Corvette Z06 C5 (MZ6)	385	2.97:1	2.07:1	1.43:1	1.00:1	0.84:1	0.56:1	2.90:1	26	27
TNET-1077		415	2.97:1	1.78:1	1.30:1	1.00:1	0.74:1	0.50:1	2.90:1		
TNET-1247	Dodge Viper	450	2.66:1	1.78:1	1.30:1	1.00:1	0.74:1	0.50:1	2.90:1	26	30
TUET-1259	4.6 Mustang Aftermarket w/mech speedo	450	2.97:1	2.07:1	1.43:1	1.00:1	0.80:1	0.62:1	3.28:1	10	31
TUET-1260	4.6 Mustang Aftermarket w/elec speedo	450	2.97:1	2.07:1	1.43:1	1.00:1	0.80:1	0.62:1	3.28:1	10	31
TUET-1452	Chevrolet Corvette	370	2.66:1	1.78:1	1.30:1	1.00:1	0.74:1	0.50:1	2.90:1	26	27
TUET-1453	Chevrolet Corvette	370	2.66:1	1.78:1	1.30:1	1.00:1	0.74:1	0.50:1	2.90:1	26	27
TUET-1576	Aston Martin	415	2.66:1	1.78:1	1.30:1	1.00:1	0.79:1	0.63:1	2.90:1	26	30
TUET-1660		350	2.66:1	1.78:1	1.30:1	1.00:1	0.74:1	0.50:1	2.90:1		27
TUET-1694	2003–2004 Mustang Cobra	450	2.66:1	1.78:1	1.30:1	1.00:1	0.79:1	0.63:1	2.90:1	10	27
TUET-1806	Dodge Viper SRT-10	550	2.66:1	1.78:1	1.30:1	1.00:1	0.74:1	0.50:1	2.90:1	26	30
TUET-2022	Cadillac CTS-V		2.97:1	2.07:1	1.43:1	1.00:1	0.84:1	0.56:1	2.90:1		
TUET-2060	Mustang Cobra	450	2.97:1	2.07:1	1.43:1	1.00:1	0.80:1	0.62:1	3.28:1	10	27
TUET-2062	Dodge Viper	550	2.66:1	1.78:1	1.30:1	1.00:1	0.74:1	0.50:1	2.90:1	26	30
TUET-2066	Pontiac GTO/Holden Monaro		2.97:1	2.07:1	1.43:1	1.00:1	0.84:1	0.56:1	2.90:1	26	27
TUET-5044	Cadillac CTS-V (M12)		2.97:1	2.07:1	1.43:1	1.00:1	0.84:1	0.56:1	2.90:1		
TUET-8381A	Holden VE GTS/R8 (M10) Vauxhall VXR8 (M10) E1	450	3.01:1	2.07:1	1.43:1	1.00:1	0.84:1	0.57:1	3.28:1	26	27
TUET-6450	T-56 Ford N/A XR6		3.35:1	2.07:1	1.35:1	1.00:1	0.80:1	0.63:1		23	31
TUET-7477	T-56 Magnum Chevy Aftermarket		2.66:1	1.78:1	1.30:1	1.00:1	0.80:1	0.63:1		26	31
TUET-7484	T-56 Magnum Ford Aftermarket		2.66:1	1.78:1	1.30:1	1.00:1	0.80:1	0.63:1		26	31
TUET-8274	T-56 Magnum Ford Aftermarket		2.97:1	2.10:1	1.46:1	1.00:1	0.74:1	0.50:1		26	31
TUET-8277	T-56 Magnum Chevy Aftermarket		2.97:1	2.10:1	1.46:1	1.00:1	0.74:1	0.50:1		26	31

== See also ==
- GM LT engine
- Borg-Warner T-5 transmission
- Tremec TR-6060 transmission
