= Cadillac CT5 =

Mid-size luxury sedan

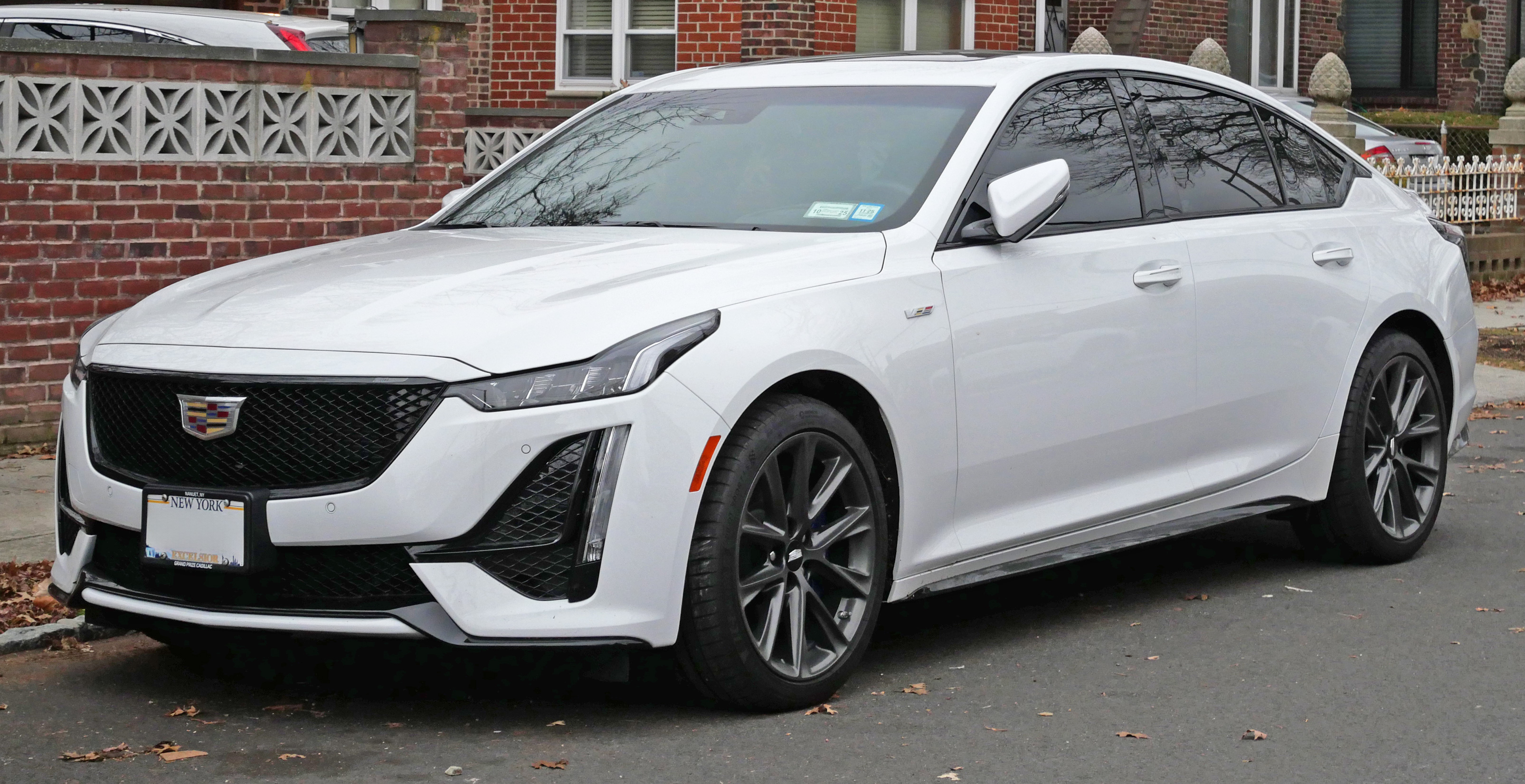
- 2024 CT5-V

Overview
- Manufacturer: General Motors
- Production: November 2019–present
- Model years: 2020–present
- Assembly: United States: Lansing, Michigan (Lansing Grand River Assembly); China: Jinqiao, Shanghai (SAIC-GM)
- Designer: Josh Thurber, Henri Kavaja

Body and chassis
- Class: Mid-size luxury car
- Body style: 4-door sedan
- Layout: FR layout / F4 layout FMR layout (V-Blackwing)
- Platform: GM Alpha 2
- Related: Chevrolet Camaro (sixth generation); Cadillac CT4

Powertrain
- Engine: 2.0 L LSY turbo I4; 3.0 L LGY twin-turbo V6; 6.2 L LT4 supercharged V8 (Blackwing)
- Transmission: 6-speed TR-6060 manual (CT5-V Blackwing only); 10-speed Hydra-Matic 10L90 automatic

Dimensions
- Wheelbase: 116.0 in (2,946 mm)
- Length: 193.8 in (4,923 mm); V-Blackwing: 195 in (4,953 mm)
- Width: 74.1 in (1,882 mm)
- Height: 57.2 in (1,453 mm); V-Blackwing: 56.6 in (1,438 mm)
- Curb weight: 3,660 lb (1,660 kg) (Luxury RWD)

Chronology
- Predecessor: Cadillac CTS Cadillac XTS

The Cadillac CT5 is a mid-size luxury car manufactured and marketed by General Motors under the Cadillac brand since 2019. It is the replacement for the Cadillac CTS.

== Overview ==
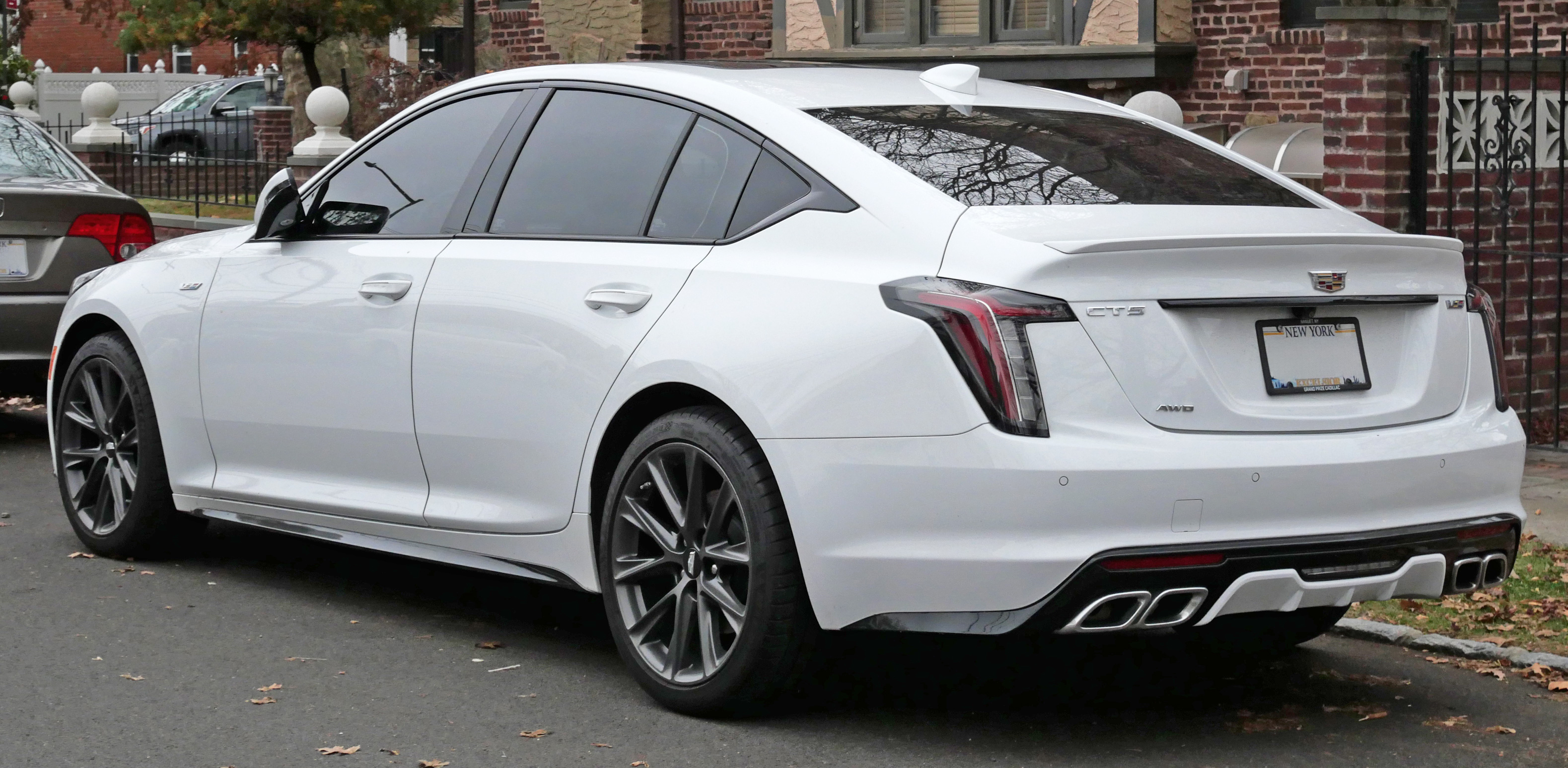
Rear view

The CT5 debuted at the 2019 New York Auto Show. Unlike its predecessor, the CTS, and the flagship CT6, the CT5's features a more fastback body style. The CT5 went on sale in the fall of 2019 and is available in four trim levels (Luxury, Premium Luxury, Sport, and V).

The base model CT5 is powered by the 2.0-liter LSY turbocharged I4 producing 237 hp (177 kW; 240 PS) at 5000 rpm and 258 lb⋅ft (350 N⋅m; 36 kg⋅m) of torque at 1500-4000 rpm. The CT5 is also offered with an optional 3.0-liter LGY twin turbocharged V6 which produces 335 hp (250 kW; 340 PS) and 405 lb⋅ft (549 N⋅m; 56 kg⋅m) of torque in the standard CT5 or 360 hp (268 kW; 365 PS) at 5400 rpm and 405 lb⋅ft (549 N⋅m; 56 kg⋅m) of torque at 2350-4000 rpm in the CT5-V. The only transmission offered is a 10-speed automatic. In 2021, Cadillac began offering their semi-autonomous driving system, Super Cruise, as an optional feature. The Super Cruise package costs additional $2,500, and is the second generation of Super Cruise technology, adding lane change on demand.

The CT5 went on sale in the U.S. in the fourth quarter of 2019 with a starting price of $36,895. In Canada, the starting price was $41,998.

=== 2025 facelift ===
A facelift for the Cadillac CT5 debuted at the 2023 North American International Detroit Auto Show and was launched in China in December 2023. The powertrain remains while featuring a restyled fascia and interior updates.

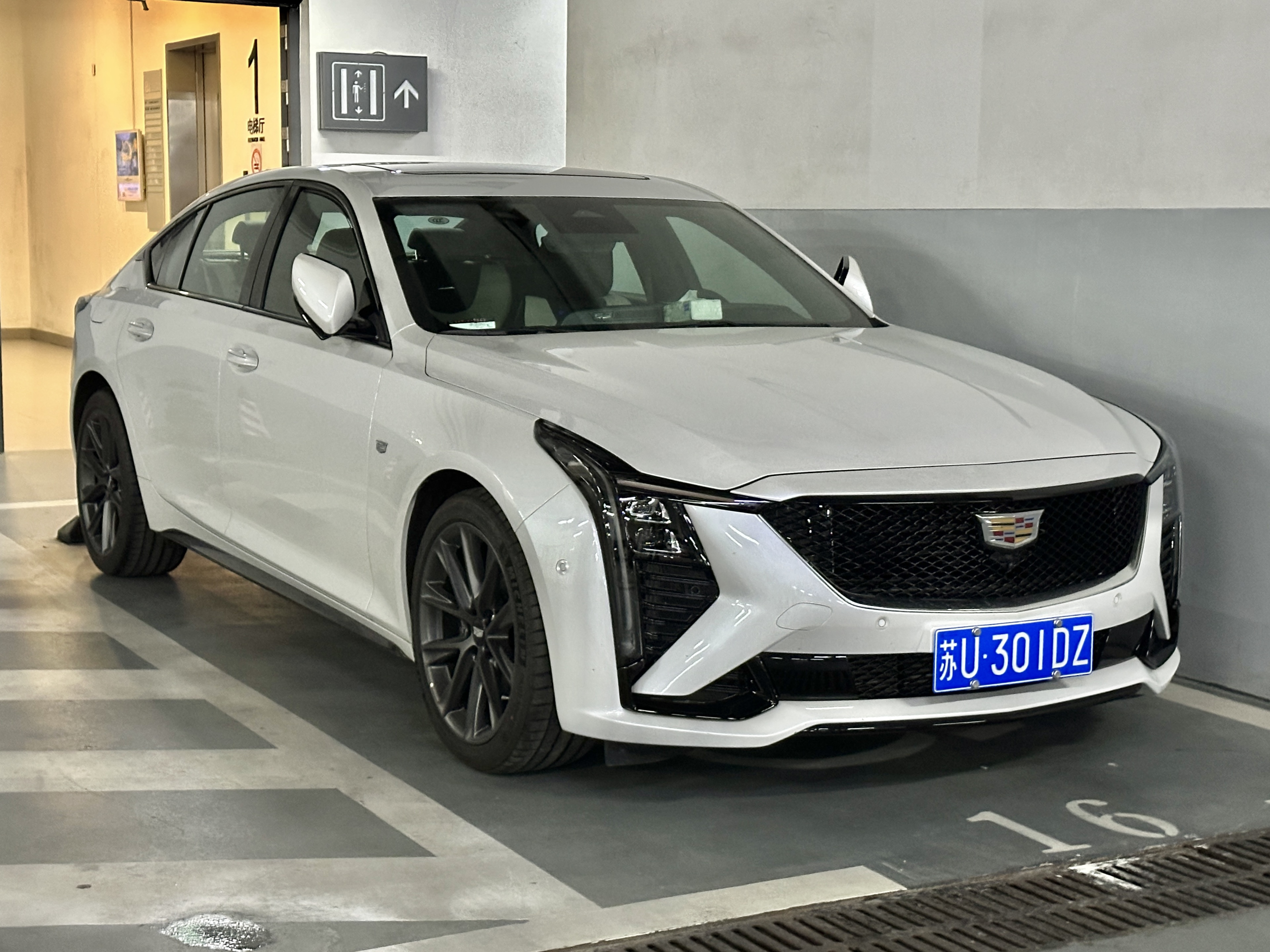
CT5 facelift

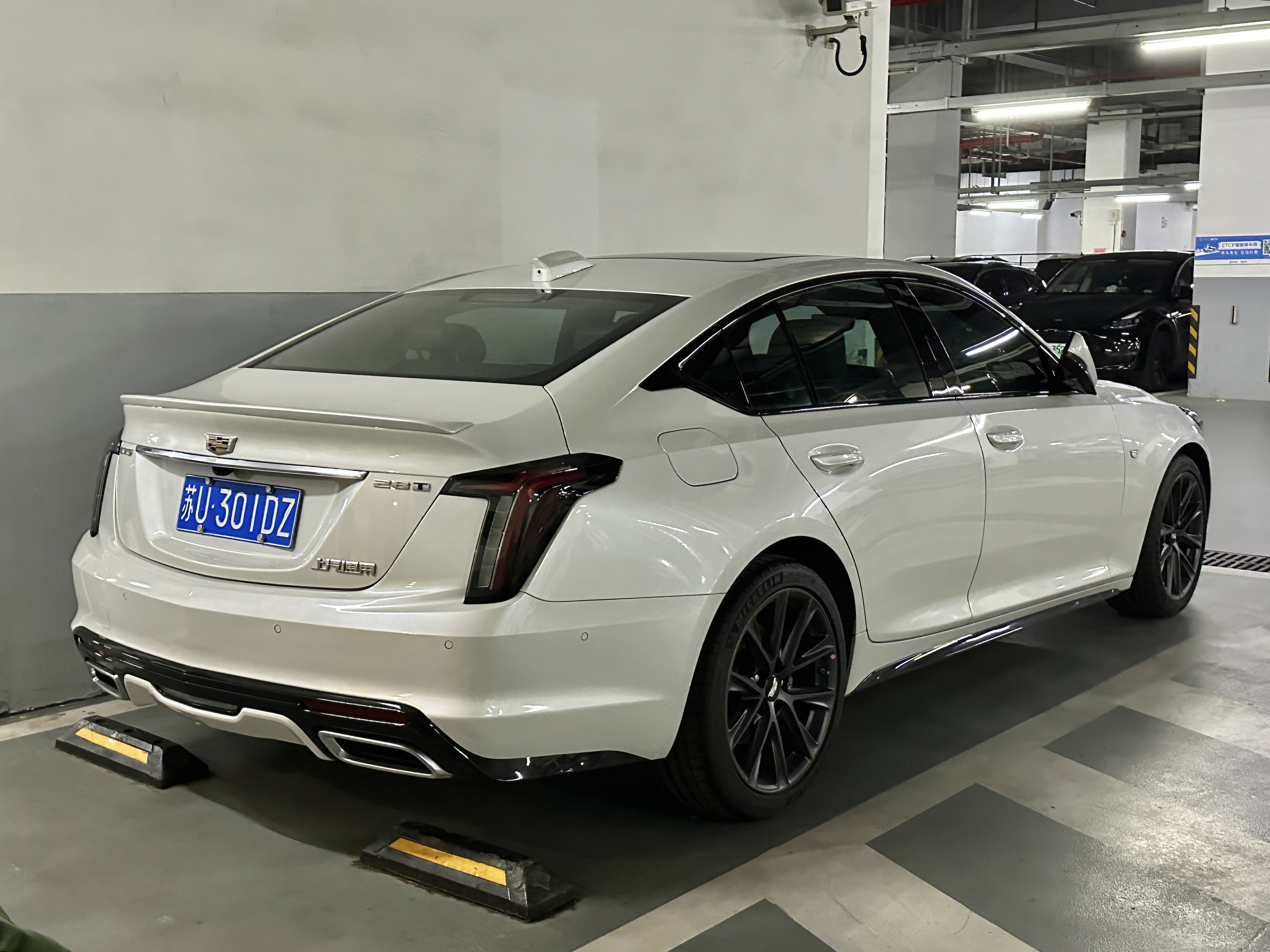
Rear view

== CT5-V ==
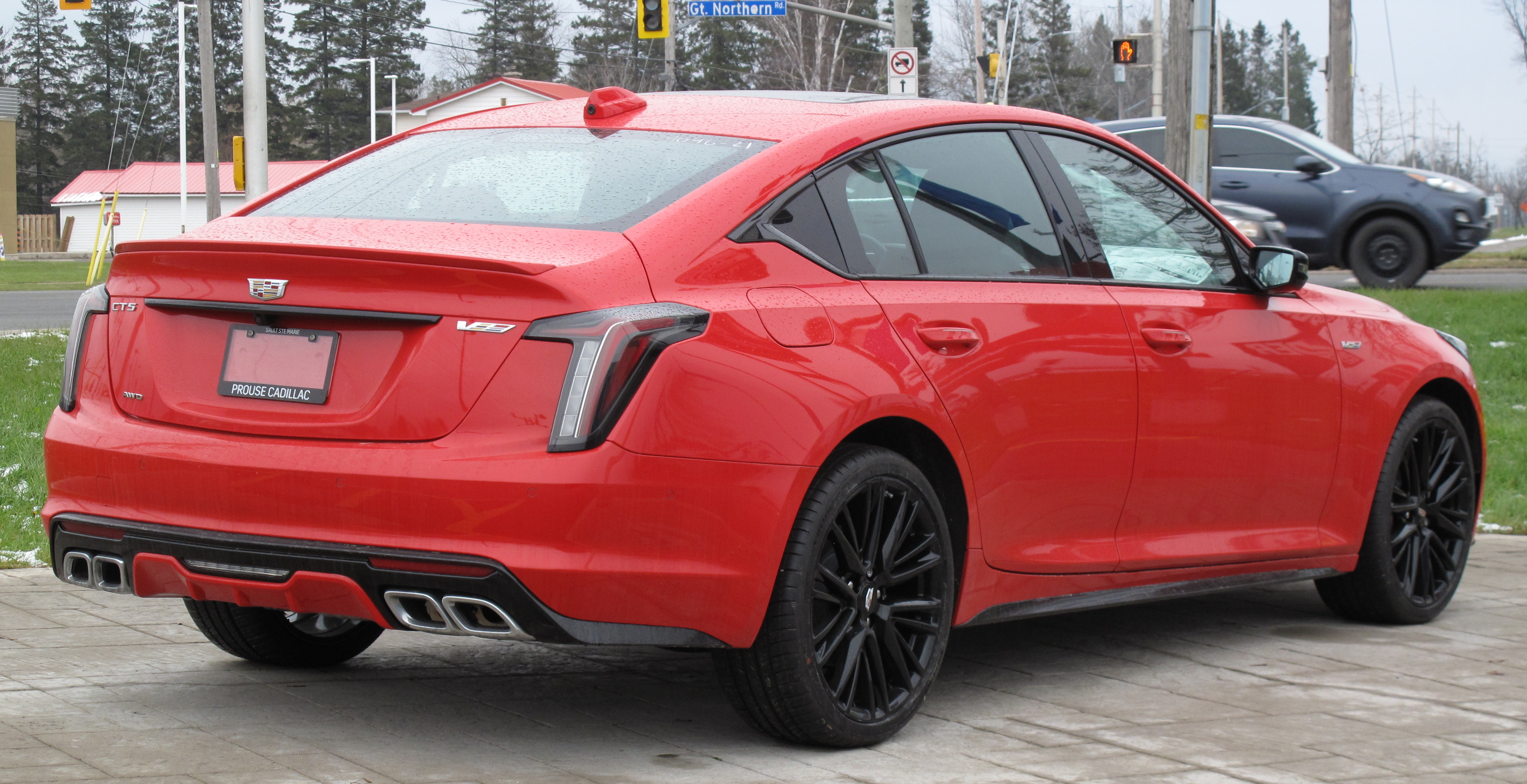
CT5-V rear

Cadillac unveiled the high-performance CT5-V on May 30, 2019, alongside the Cadillac CT4-V. It replaced the CTS-V Sport and the XTS-V Sport. The CT5-V is powered by the 3.0-liter LGY twin turbocharged V6 producing 360 hp (268 kW; 365 PS) at 5400 rpm and 405 lb⋅ft (549 N⋅m; 56 kg⋅m) of torque at 2350-4000 rpm. In the U.S., it carried a starting price of $47,695 for 2020.

The CT5-V came with MagneRide (GM Magnetic Ride Control) starting with the 2020 model.

== CT5-V Blackwing ==
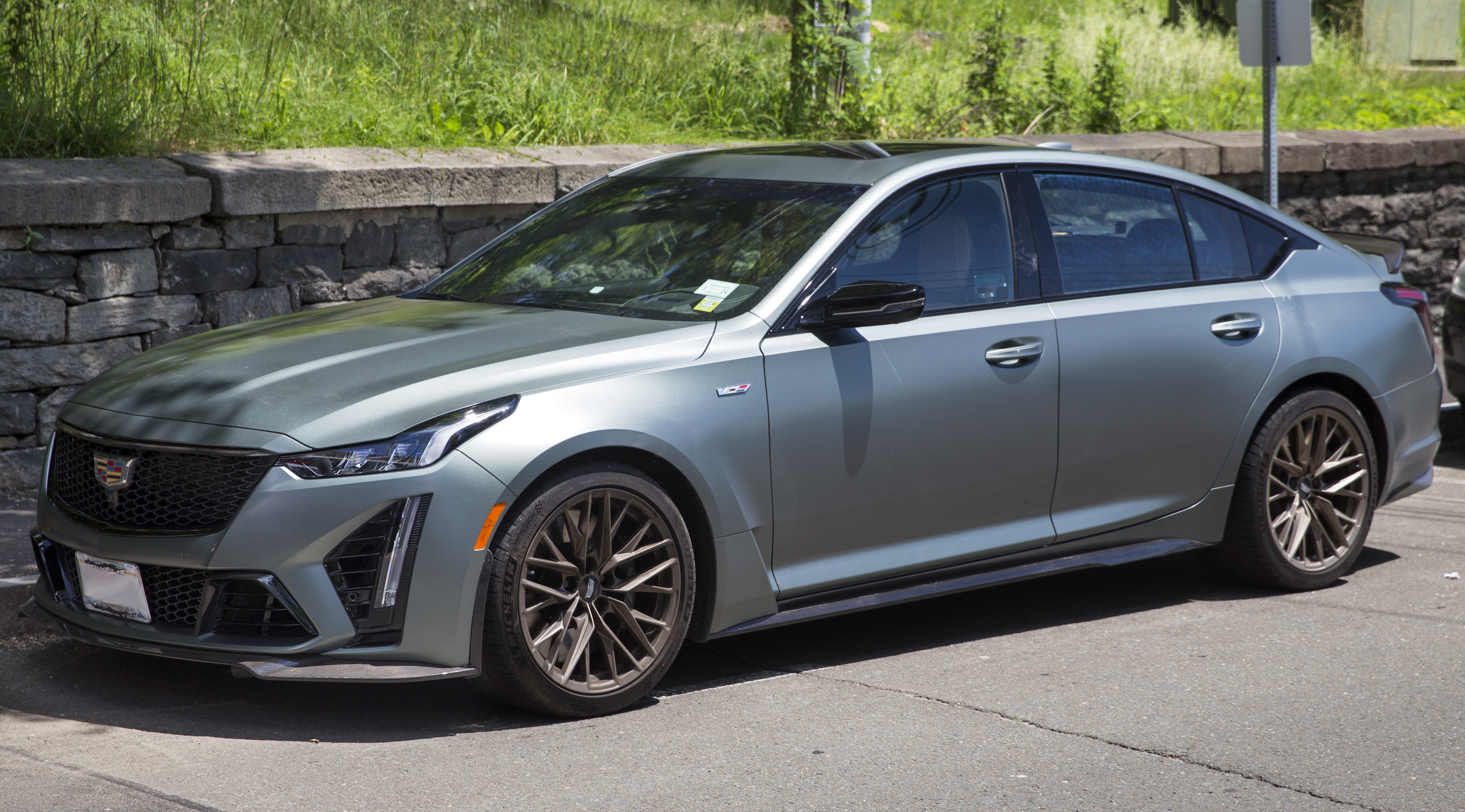
2022 Cadillac CT5-V Blackwing

The CT5-V Blackwing was announced in early 2021 for the 2022 model year as a high-performance version of the CT5-V and is considered to be the spiritual successor to the Cadillac CTS-V. It features a supercharged 6.2-liter V8 engine that produces 668 hp (498 kW; 677 PS) and 659 lb⋅ft (893 N⋅m; 91 kg⋅m) of torque, which comes standard mated with a 6-speed manual transmission, and is also available with an optional 10-speed automatic. Cadillac claims the CT5-V Blackwing has a 0–60 mph (0–97 km/h) time of 3.4 seconds with a 10-speed automatic transmission along with a top speed of 209 mph (336 km/h). Upon release, it was announced by Cadillac that the CT5-V Blackwing, alongside the smaller CT4-V Blackwing, would be the last gasoline-powered V models that Cadillac would produce.

The Cadillac CT5-V Blackwing is also available with carbon-ceramic Brembo brakes. The optional carbon-ceramic system (which is copper-free) is around 64 pounds (29 kg) lighter than the standard cast-iron system. This is the first time Cadillac has offered a carbon-ceramic brake package.

== Awards ==
The CT5-V Blackwing was named in Car and Driver's 10 Best List in 2022-2026.

== Sales ==
Calendar year	United States	Canada	China
2019	43		6,191
2020	14,711	852	45,026
2021	9,446	925	62,098
2022	15,896	1,038	65,480
2023	18,593	1,038	82,356
2024	14,861	926	61,126
2025	16,561	957	40,481

== See also ==
- Cadillac CT4
