= GM L3B engine =

General Motors L3B engine

Overview
- Manufacturer: General Motors
- Production: 2018–present

Layout
- Configuration: Inline-4
- Displacement: 2.7 L; 166.4 cu in (2,727 cc)
- Cylinder bore: 92.25 mm (3.63 in)
- Piston stroke: 102 mm (4.02 in)
- Cylinder block material: 380 T5 Cast Aluminum
- Cylinder head material: 356 T5 Cast Aluminum
- Valvetrain: DOHC 4 valves/cyl with VVT and VVL
- Compression ratio: 10.0:1

RPM range
- Max. engine speed: 6100 RPM

Combustion
- Turbocharger: Single BorgWarner Dual-Volute w/ electrically actuated wastegate
- Fuel system: Gasoline direct injection
- Fuel type: Gasoline
- Oil system: Wet sump
- Cooling system: Water cooled

Output
- Power output: 237–350 hp (177–261 kW; 240–355 PS)
- Torque output: 259–455 lb⋅ft (351–617 N⋅m)

Emissions
- Emissions target standard: Tier III, Bin 50
- Emissions control systems: Three-way catalytic converter, wide-band heated oxygen sensor

The GM L3B engine is a turbocharged four-cylinder gasoline engine designed by General Motors. It is an undersquare aluminum DOHC inline-four displacing 2.7 liters (166 cid) and tuned for strong low-end torque.

In addition to GM's active fuel management, start-stop system, and variable valve timing, which are already featured on GM's other full-size pickup truck engines, this engine also features GM's Intake Valve Lift Control which has 3 different intake cam profiles that are electromagnetically actuated to provide improved fuel economy and performance at a wider range of operating conditions.

The BorgWarner developed turbo can produce up to 27 psi (1.9 bar) of boost thanks in part to its unique dual volute turbine housing and an electrically actuated wastegate. Instead of two side-by-side exhaust passages like on a regular twin-scroll turbocharger, in this design the two exhaust passages are concentric and allow for better use of the exhaust pulse energy.

== History ==
The L3B was first used in the Chevrolet Silverado and GMC Sierra, with an output of 310 hp (231 kW) at 5600 rpm and 348 lb⋅ft (472 N⋅m) at 1500 rpm. With the unveiling of the 2022 model year Silverado, GM announced a significant revision that stiffened and strengthened the engine allowing for a GM-estimated increased maximum torque rating of 430 lb⋅ft (583 N⋅m) while also improving noise, vibration, and harshness (NVH). Parts are cast at Bedford Casting Operations in Indiana. Assembly is at Spring Hill Manufacturing, Tennessee, USA. The L3B is the successor to the 3.6L V6 LGX, 3.6L V6 LGZ, and 4.3L V6 LV3 engines.

== Specifications ==
The engine is the first GM truck engine to feature an active thermal management system. This system consists of an electrically driven water pump and a 3-way rotary valve which allows the engine to maintain proper operating temperatures and quicker warm-ups. Also, a continuously variable oil pump helps to lower parasitic losses and provide proper lubrication and cooling to the engine, especially under high-load conditions. The Active Fuel Management system can shut down the middle two cylinders under low-power conditions.

Cylinder liners are spun nodular iron.

The low-output work truck variant runs 10 psi of boost, the 390 lb⋅ft variant runs 20 psi, and the 430 lb⋅ft variant runs 27 psi.

== Applications ==
Year(s)	Model	Power	Torque	Notes
2019–2021	Chevrolet Silverado and GMC Sierra 1500	231 kW (310 hp) @ 5600 rpm	348 lb⋅ft (472 N⋅m) @ 1500 rpm	
2022–2026	Chevrolet Silverado and GMC Sierra 1500	231 kW (310 hp) @ 5600 rpm	430 lb⋅ft (583 N⋅m) @ 3000 rpm	TurboMax name
2027–present	Chevrolet Silverado and GMC Sierra 1500	261 kW (350 hp) @ 5600 rpm	455 lb⋅ft (617 N⋅m) @ 3000 rpm	TurboMax name
2020–present	Cadillac CT4	231 kW (310 hp) @ 5500 rpm	350 lb⋅ft (475 N⋅m) @ 1500 rpm	
2020–present	Cadillac CT4	V: 242 kW (325 hp) @ 5500 rpm	380 lb⋅ft (515 N⋅m) @ 2000 rpm	
2023–2024	Chevrolet Colorado	177 kW (237 hp) @ 5600 rpm	259 lb⋅ft (351 N⋅m) @ 3000 rpm	detuned with different components, RPO code L2R
2023	Chevrolet Colorado	231 kW (310 hp) @ 5600 rpm	390 lb⋅ft (529 N⋅m) @ 2000 rpm	Turbo Plus
2023–present	Chevrolet Colorado and GMC Canyon	231 kW (310 hp) @ 5600 rpm	430 lb⋅ft (583 N⋅m) @ 3000 rpm	
2024–2025	Chevrolet Tahoe and GMC Yukon	224 kW (300 hp) @ 5500 rpm	369 lb⋅ft (500 N⋅m) @2000 rpm	TurboMax name, Mainland China market only

=== 2.5L LK0 ===
Year(s)	Model	Power	Torque	Dyno Chart
2024–present	Chevrolet Traverse	328 hp (245 kW) @ 5500 rpm	326 lb⋅ft (442 N⋅m) @ 3500 rpm	
2024–present	GMC Acadia	328 hp (245 kW) @ 5500 rpm	326 lb⋅ft (442 N⋅m) @ 3500 rpm	
2025-present	Buick Enclave	328 hp (245 kW) @ 5500 rpm	326 lb⋅ft (442 N⋅m) @ 3500 rpm	
