= Cadillac CT4 =

Compact luxury sedan

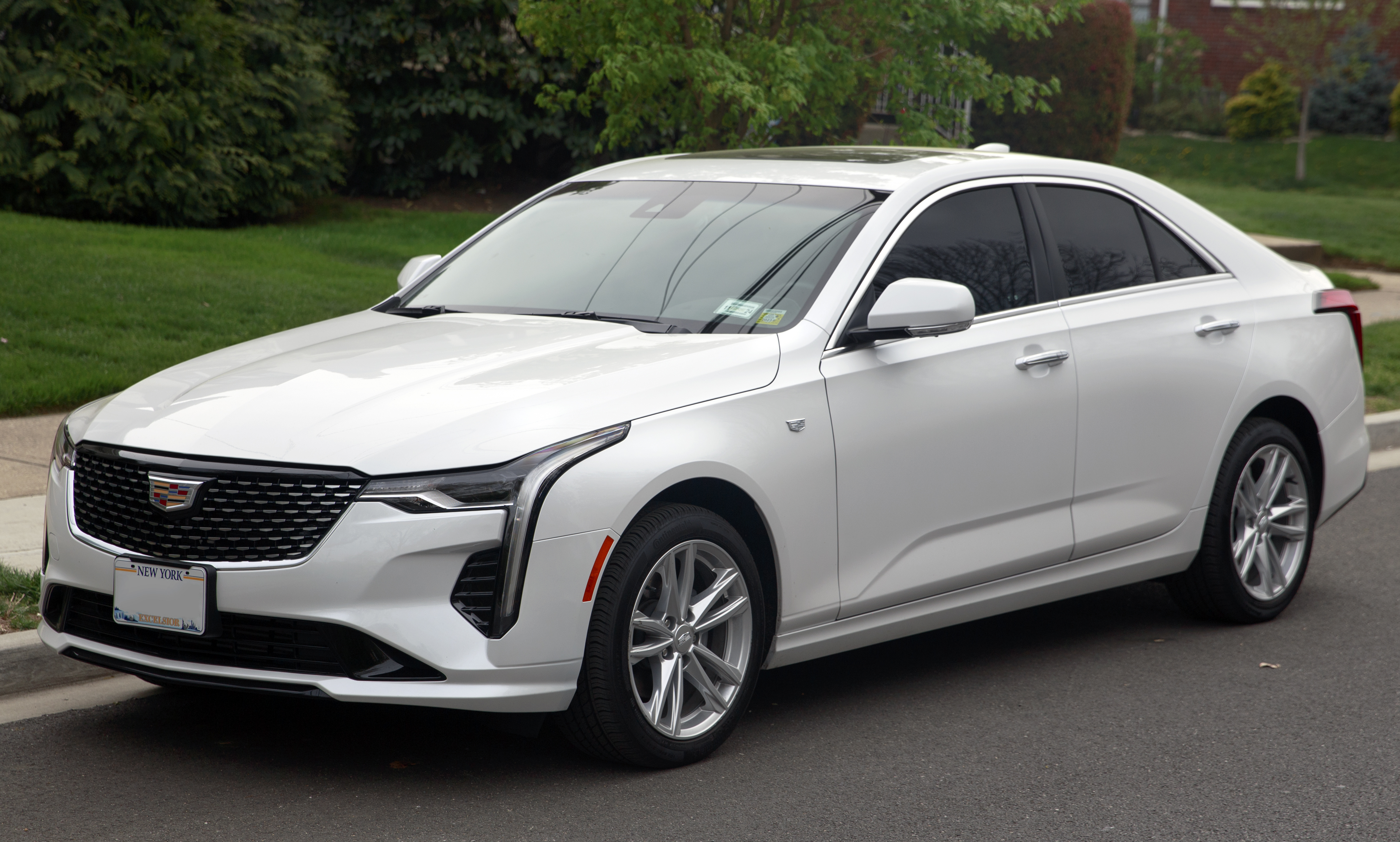

Overview
- Manufacturer: General Motors
- Production: 2019–2026 (China); 2020–2026 (United States)
- Model years: 2020–2026
- Assembly: United States: Lansing, Michigan (Lansing Grand River Assembly); China: Jinqiao, Shanghai (SAIC-GM) The CT4 Was sold officially in United States, Canada, China, UAE, Qatar, Saudi Arabia, Kuwait, Oman, And Bahrain.
- Designer: Aaron Riggs, Dillon Blanski

Body and chassis
- Class: Compact executive car (D)
- Body style: 4-door sedan
- Layout: Front-engine, rear-wheel-drive Front-engine, four-wheel-drive
- Platform: GM Alpha 2
- Related: Cadillac CT5; Chevrolet Camaro (sixth generation)

Powertrain
- Engine: Gasoline: 1.5 L LDF turbo I4 (China only: 25T); 2.0 L LSY turbo I4 (In China: 28T); 2.7 L L3B turbo I4; 3.6 L LF4 twin-turbo V6 (Blackwing)
- Transmission: 6-speed TR-6060 manual (CT4 V Blackwing); 8-speed 8L45 automatic 10-speed Hydra-Matic 10L90 automatic

Dimensions
- Wheelbase: 109.3 in (2,776 mm)
- Length: 187.2 in (4,755 mm)
- Width: 71.5 in (1,816 mm)
- Height: 56.0 in (1,422 mm)
- Curb weight: 3,616 lb (1,640 kg) (CT4-V, RWD)

Chronology
- Predecessor: Cadillac ATS; Cadillac ATS-V (CT4-V Blackwing)

The Cadillac CT4 is a sedan manufactured and marketed by Cadillac. It replaced the Cadillac ATS sedan and sits below the CT5 in Cadillac's lineup. The CT4-V was unveiled on May 30, 2019, followed by the standard CT4 four months later.

Production officially concluded on June 25, 2026.

== Overview ==
The CT4 went on sale in the second quarter of 2020. Cadillac assembles the CT4 at the Lansing Grand River Assembly plant in Lansing, Michigan, as well as in SAIC-GM Jinqiao plant in China. Following Cadillac's new "Y" trim strategy, the CT4 is offered in base "Luxury" trim, as well as "Premium Luxury" and "Sport" trims.

The base engine is a 2.0-liter turbocharged four-cylinder, producing 237 hp (177 kW; 240 PS) and 258 lb⋅ft (350 N⋅m) torque. Optional with the Premium Luxury trim is a 2.7-liter turbocharged inline-four, producing 310 hp (231 kW; 314 PS) and 350 lb⋅ft (475 N⋅m) of torque. For 2023, GM China offers a new base engine in the CT4, a 1.5-liter turbocharged four-cylinder, producing 208 hp (155 kW; 211 PS) and 199 lb⋅ft (270 N⋅m; 28 kg⋅m) torque.

The CT4 was discontinued in the Chinese market in 2026.

North American production of the CT4 ended June 2026.

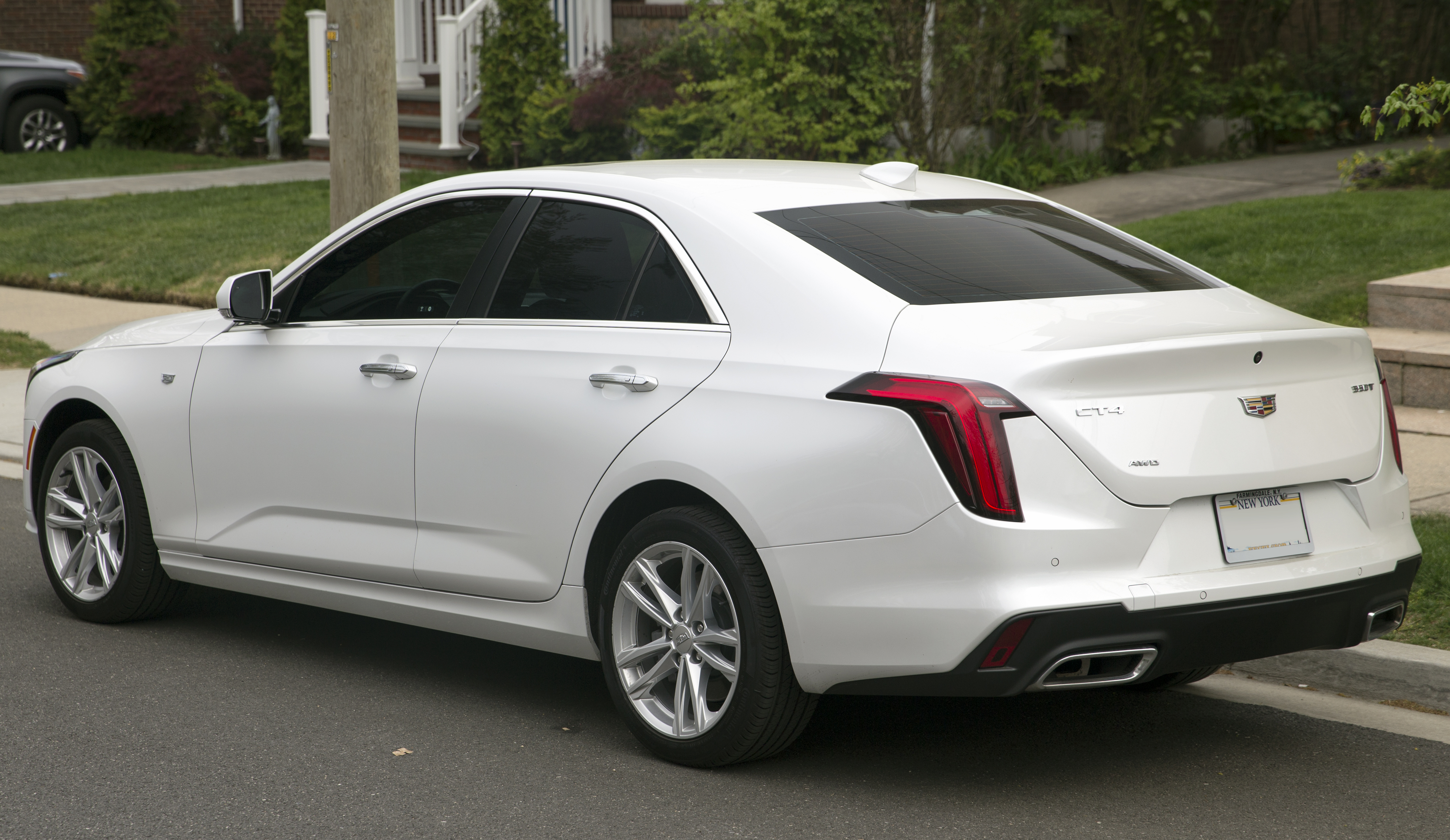
Rear view

== CT4-V ==
Cadillac unveiled a high performance variant, the CT4-V, on May 30, 2019, alongside the CT5-V. It is powered by a 2.7-liter turbocharged inline-four producing 325 hp (242 kW; 330 PS) and 380 lb⋅ft (515 N⋅m; 53 kg⋅m) of torque.

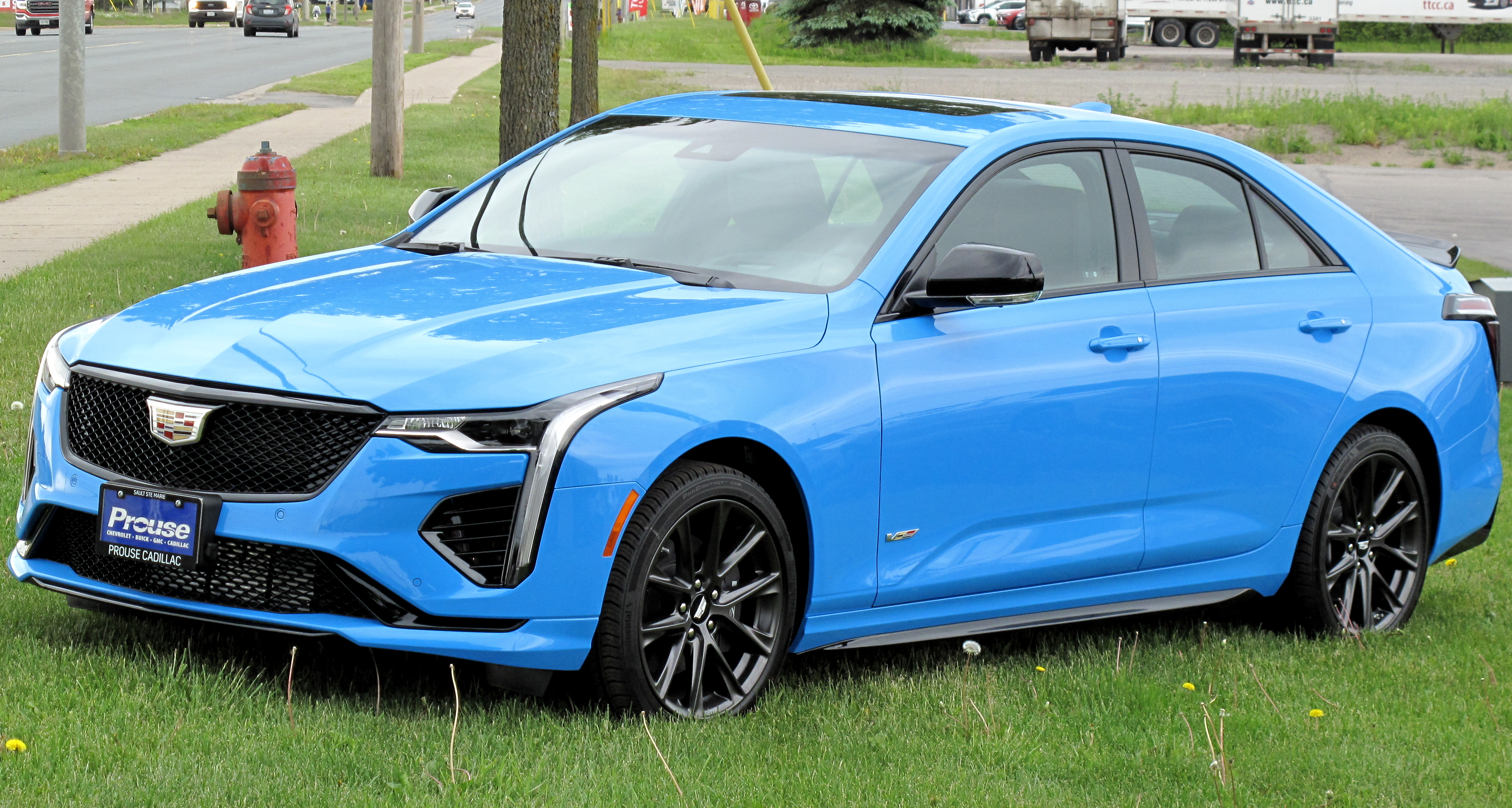
CT4-V

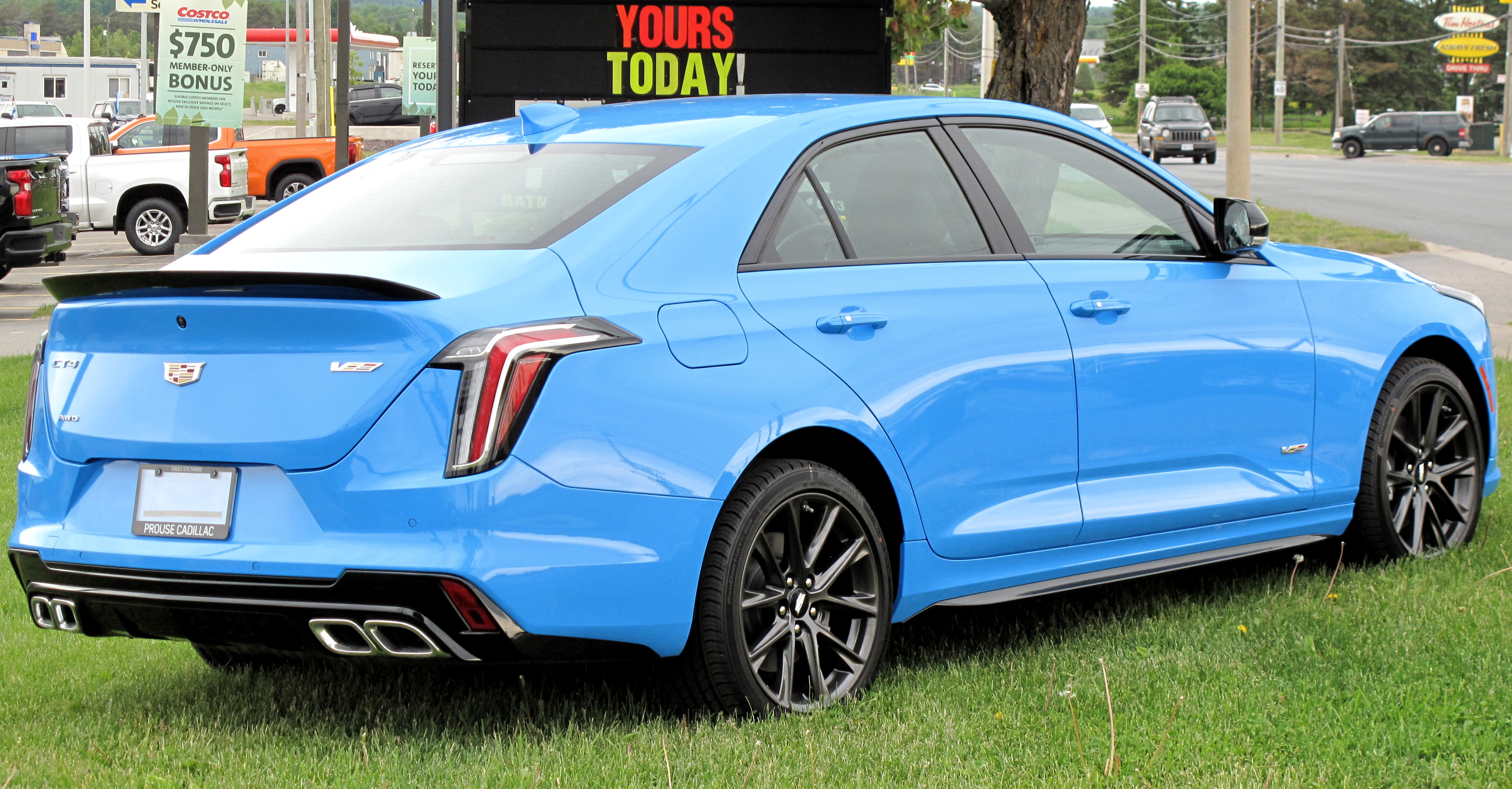
CT4-V (rear)

== CT4-V Blackwing ==
The CT4-V Blackwing is a high-performance version of the CT4-V that serves as a replacement to the ATS-V. It is powered by a 3.6-liter twin-turbocharged V6 engine, producing 472 hp (352 kW; 479 PS) and 445 lb⋅ft (603 N⋅m; 62 kg⋅m) of torque. It comes standard with a 6-speed Tremec manual transmission and is also available with an optional 10-speed automatic. Cadillac claims a 0–60 mph (0–97 km/h) time of 3.9 seconds with the automatic and 4.2 with the manual gearbox, a top speed of 189 mph (304 km/h), and a 1/4 mile time of 12.14 at 117 mph (188 km/h). The CT4-V Blackwing went on sale in early 2021 with a limited number of pre-orders. Upon release, it was announced by Cadillac that the CT4-V Blackwing, alongside the larger CT5-V Blackwing, would be the last gasoline-powered V models that Cadillac would produce.

== Awards ==
The CT4-V Blackwing was named in Car and Driver's 10 Best List in 2022–2026.

== Sales ==
Calendar year	United States	China
2020	4,889	16,616
2021	7,253	14,809
2022	9,271	9,738
2023	9,144	8,352
2024	6,208	1,084
2025	5,616	8

== See also ==
- Cadillac CT5
