= General Motors E platform =

Automotive platform

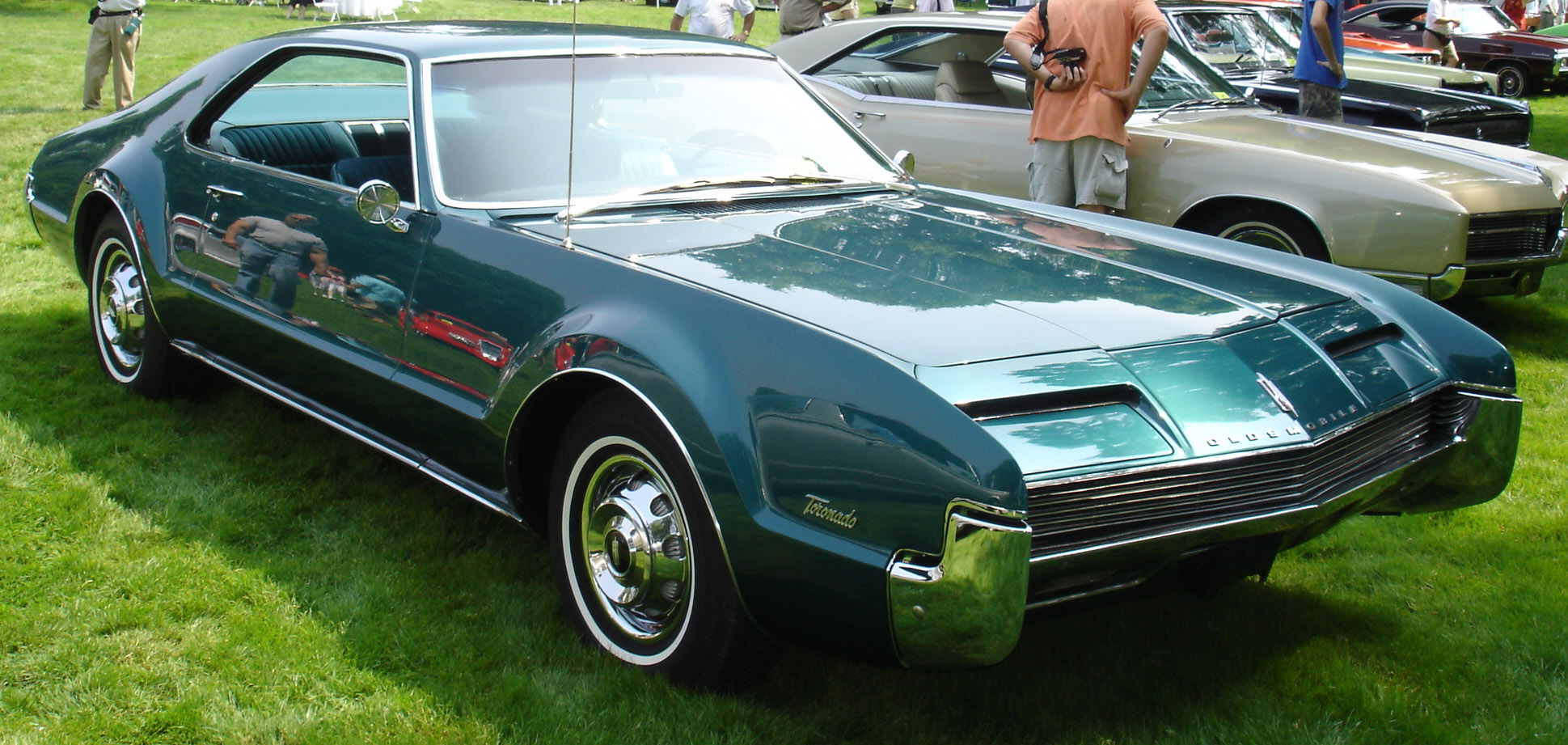
1966 Oldsmobile Toronado

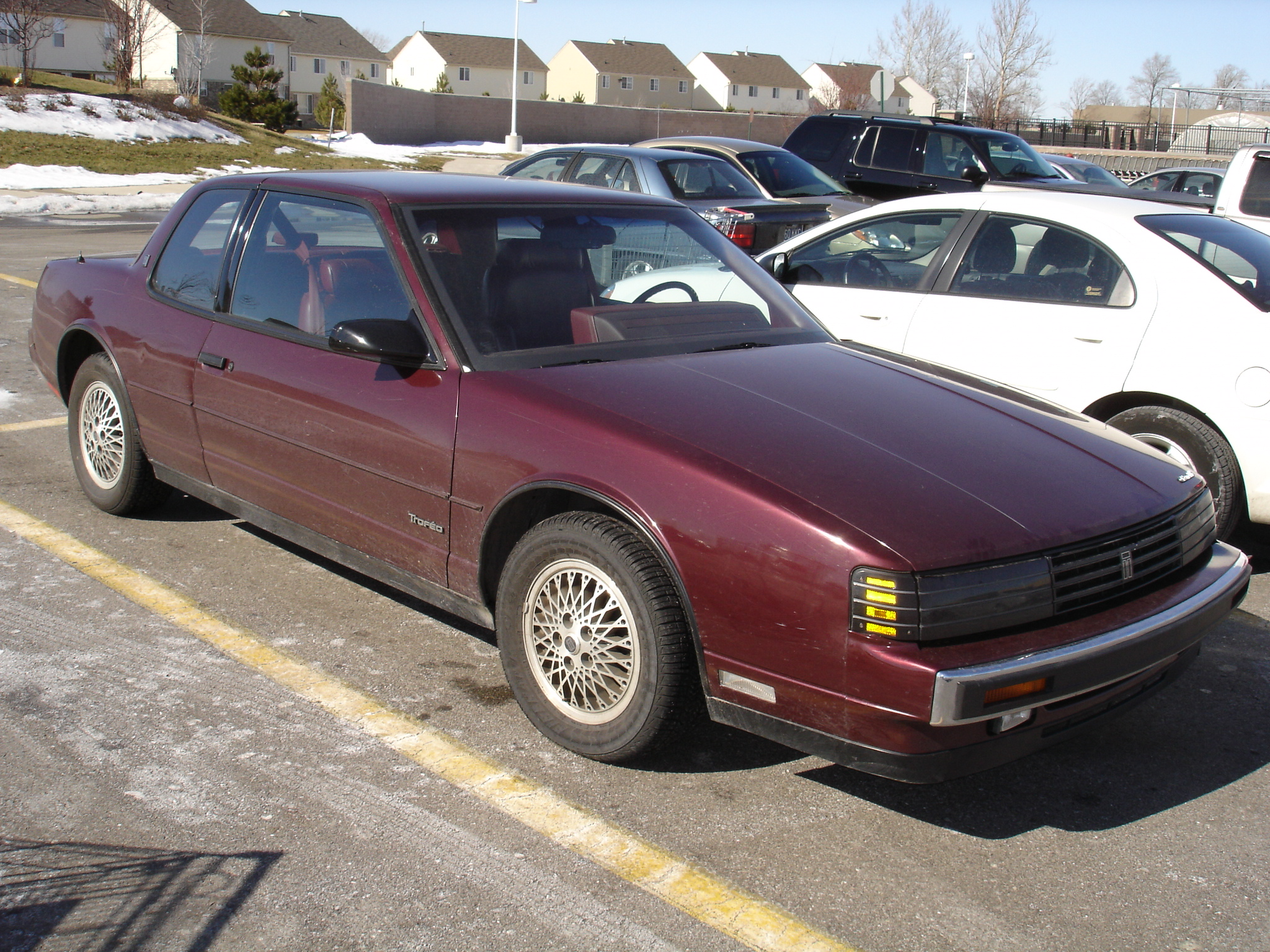
1988 Oldsmobile Toronado Troféo

The General Motors E platform or E-body was the automobile platform designation used for a number of personal luxury cars produced from 1963 to 2002. Notably, early E-bodies were produced in both front wheel drive and rear wheel drive configurations, and were the first front wheel drive automobiles produced in the United States since 1937. The initial front-wheel drive E-platform power plant was referred to as the Unitized Power Package (UPP).

E-bodies were re-engineered to a smaller size in 1979, gaining a relationship to the FWD K-platform used in the Cadillac Seville. Later, the cars were made smaller still with the 1986 redesign, along with the K-body. Most 1986–1993 E-bodies were produced at GM's high-tech Detroit/Hamtramck Assembly plant, with the Buick Reatta being built at the Lansing Craft Centre—then known as the Reatta Craft Centre. GM used the E-body designation until the Cadillac Eldorado ceased production in 2002.

The E-body was used as the basis for the V-body Cadillac Allanté luxury coupes. It also provided the front end of the GMC Motorhome and the Jetway 707 limousine.

This body shell designation was used for the following vehicles:

- 1963–1976 Buick Riviera (RWD)
- 1979–1985 Buick Riviera (FWD, longitudinal engine)
- 1986–1993 Buick Riviera (FWD, transverse engine)
- 1988–1991 Buick Reatta (FWD, transverse engine, shortened chassis)
- 1967–1985 Cadillac Eldorado (FWD, longitudinal engine)
- 1986–2002 Cadillac Eldorado (FWD, transverse engine)
- 1966–1985 Oldsmobile Toronado (FWD, longitudinal engine)
- 1986–1992 Oldsmobile Toronado (FWD, transverse engine)

== See also ==
- List of General Motors platforms
