= Cadillac Allanté =

Luxury roadster produced by Cadillac

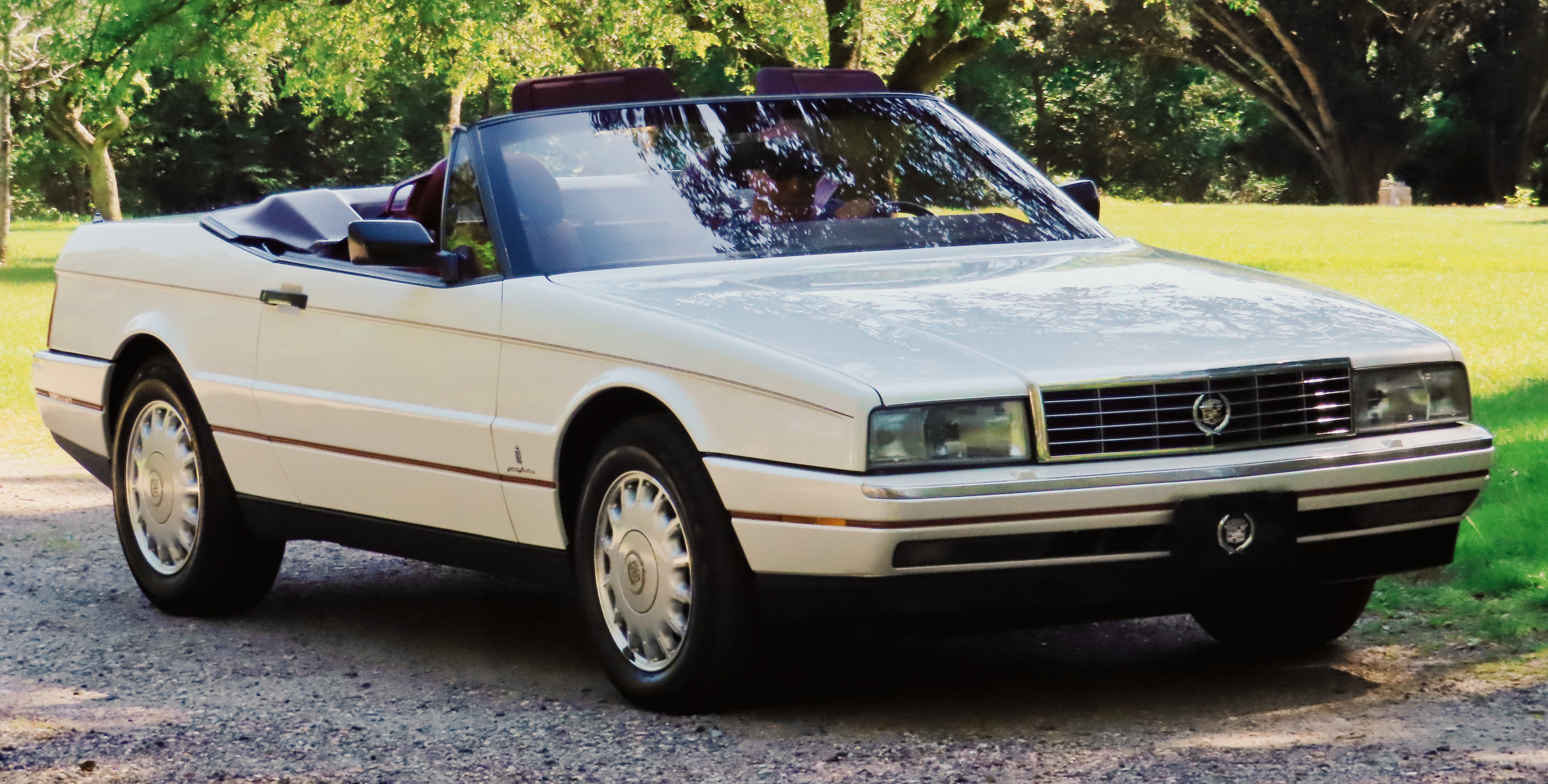

Overview
- Manufacturer: Cadillac; General Motors; Pininfarina (body)
- Production: 1986–July 16, 1993; 21,430 produced
- Model years: 1987–1993
- Assembly: Italy: San Giorgio Canavese (body); United States: Detroit, Michigan (Detroit/Hamtramck Assembly: final assembly)
- Designer: Mario Vernacchia at Pininfarina

Body and chassis
- Class: Luxury roadster
- Body style: 2-door convertible
- Layout: Transverse front-engine, front-wheel drive
- Platform: V-body

Powertrain
- Engine: 4.1 L HT-4100 V8 (1987–1988); 4.5 L LW2 V8 (1989–1992); 4.6 L L37 Northstar V8 (1993)
- Transmission: 4-speed F-7 automatic (1987–1992); 4-speed 4T80-E automatic (1993)

Dimensions
- Wheelbase: 99.4 in (2,525 mm)
- Length: 1987–1989: 178.6 in (4,536 mm); 1990–1993: 178.7 in (4,539 mm)
- Width: 1987–1991: 73.5 in (1,867 mm); 1992–1993: 73.4 in (1,864 mm)
- Height: 1987–1991: 52.2 in (1,326 mm); 1992–1993: 51.5 in (1,308 mm)
- Curb weight: 3,720 lb (1,690 kg)

Chronology
- Successor: Cadillac XLR

The Cadillac Allanté is a two-door, two-seat luxury convertible roadster marketed by Cadillac for the 1987 to 1993 model years. with either a standard or optional removable hardtop.

In an unusual arrangement, the Allanté used a Cadillac chassis and mechanicals, while its bodywork was manufactured in Italy by Pininfarina, and airfreighted to Detroit for final assembly. With its Allanté model name selected by General Motors from 1,700 computer-generated potential names, over 21,000 were manufactured over seven years of production.

== Conception and design ==
To maintain luxury market position in the 1980s, Cadillac sought an aspirational model that would combine the prestige of a European design with the renown of a European coachbuilder — to help Cadillac compete with Mercedes and Jaguar. It would become the first modern-era two-passenger Cadillac roadster, and the first to wear the Cadillac name since the Cadillac Series 355 roadster of the 1930s.

Cadillac General Manager Bob Burger sent engineers to Italy in 1982 to meet with designers and coachbuilders to explore a partnership with Cadillac. According to program manager Ed Anderson, the team identified Pininfarina as their top choice, and Cadillac chose them to design the Allanté, under the direction of Sergio Pininfarina, working with a team of designers including Mario Vernacchia.

At GM, Chuck Jordan was torn because delegating the design to Pininfarina implied that GM's 3,000 internal designers were unable to pen the design. GM stylist Wayne Kady along with Vice President of Design, Irv Rybicki, fought to have the design crafted in-house, Kady later saying GM leadership had decided to go with an Italian design even before Cadillac’s designers began work.

The in-house designers were hurt and angry. Kady said to management, “We’ve done all your bread and butter cars through the years, but when it’s time to do a historic and fun project, you give it to someone else.” Cadillac General Manager Bob Burger later told the in-house designers the company was "looking for a car with a designer name to it. It’s like Levi's, it’s that tag on the back of the jeans."

Chuck Jordan (at the time assigned in Europe with Opel) was not to examine Pininfarina's work. However, he could see the design before it was frozen for development because he was friends with Sergio Pininfarina. As later told by Maria Vernacchia, Jordan referred to the Allanté as ‘The New Spirit of Cadillac,’ only suggesting a front grille similar to the typical Ferrari's with a classic rectangular grid design. Pininfarina opened a new facility specifically for Allanté manufacture outside Turin in rural San Giorgio Canavese, as a dedicated vehicle assembly plant, part of what would become a very long assembly process.

The car was built on a unique platform known as the V-body, which was a shortened version of the E platform that underpinned the Cadillac Eldorado and other contemporary personal luxury coupes.

The nameplate Allanté was selected by GM from 1,700 computer-generated potential names. Originally designed to compete with the Mercedes-Benz SL and Jaguar XJS, the Allanté initially featured a modified variant of the HT-4100 V8 used across Cadillac's model line. This was changed to the 4.5 L V8 in 1989 and, in turn, to the 4.6 L L37 Northstar in 1993.

All Allanté models featured a fully electronic instrument and control panel, which was angled towards the driver, without knobs or manual controls. GM also implemented electronic controls in select premium mid-to-late 1980s luxury vehicles such as the Buick Reatta, Buick Riviera, and Oldsmobile Toronado Trofeo. However, these vehicles included a touchscreen control panel called the Graphic Control Center (GCC), which the Allanté did not.

== Air Bridge production ==
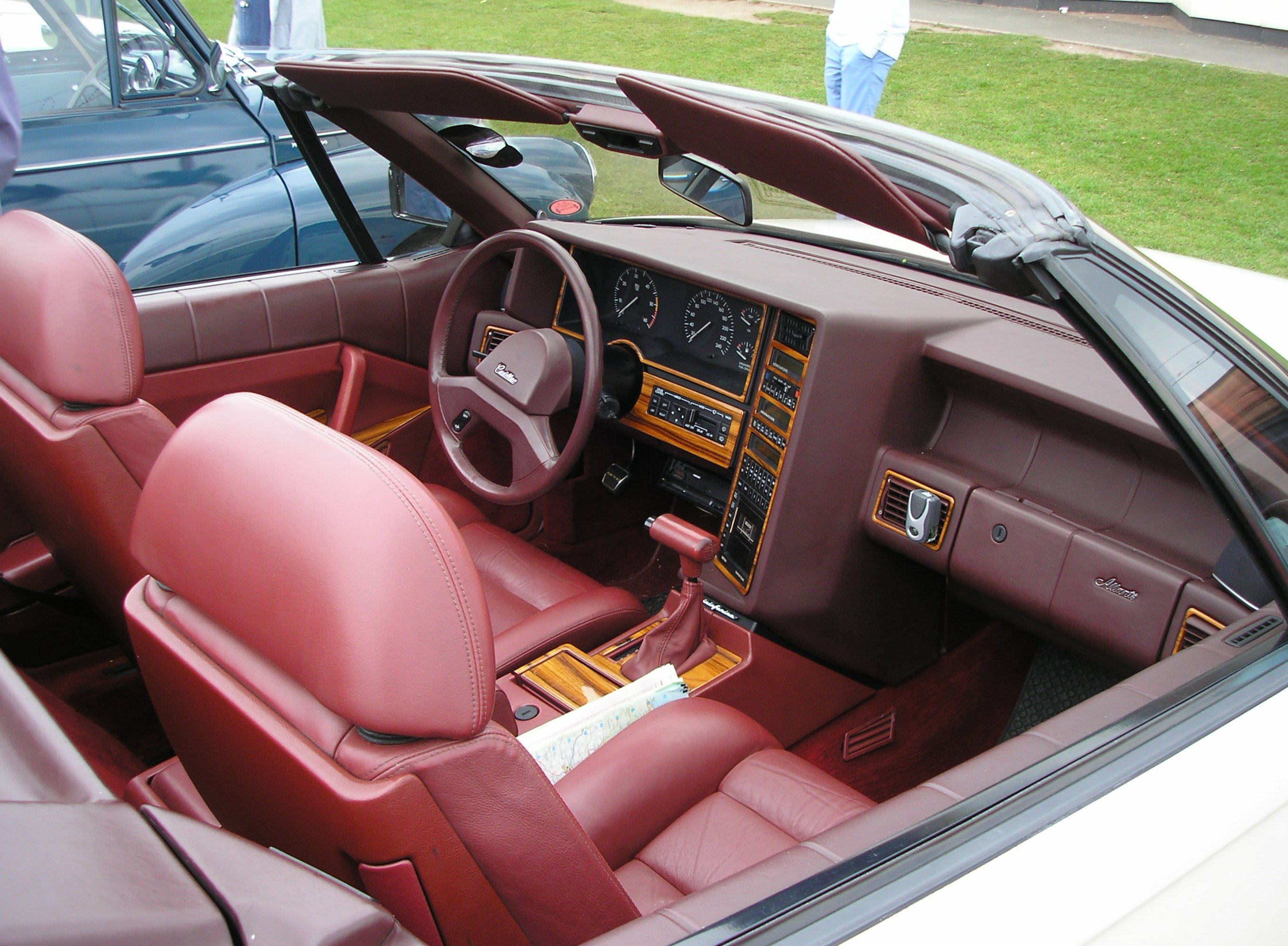
Allanté interior

The Allanté incorporated an international production arrangement similar to the early 1950s Nash-Healey two-passenger sports car. The Allanté bodies were designed and manufactured in Italy by Pininfarina and were shipped to the U.S. for final assembly with domestically manufactured chassis and engine, eventually leading it to be referred to as "the world's longest assembly line." Specially equipped Boeing 747s departed from Turin International Airport with 56 bodies at a time, arriving at Detroit City Airport about 3 miles (4.8 km) northeast of Cadillac's new Hamtramck Assembly plant. This undertaking was known as the "Allanté Air Bridge". The expensive shipping process stemmed from GM's recent closing of Fisher Body Plant #18, which had supplied Cadillac bodies since 1921. It was not the first time that Cadillac joint-ventured with Pininfarina, having subcontracted body production for the 1959 Eldorado Brougham and design and coachworks for several one-offs, customs, and concept cars.

== Model year changes ==
=== 1987 ===
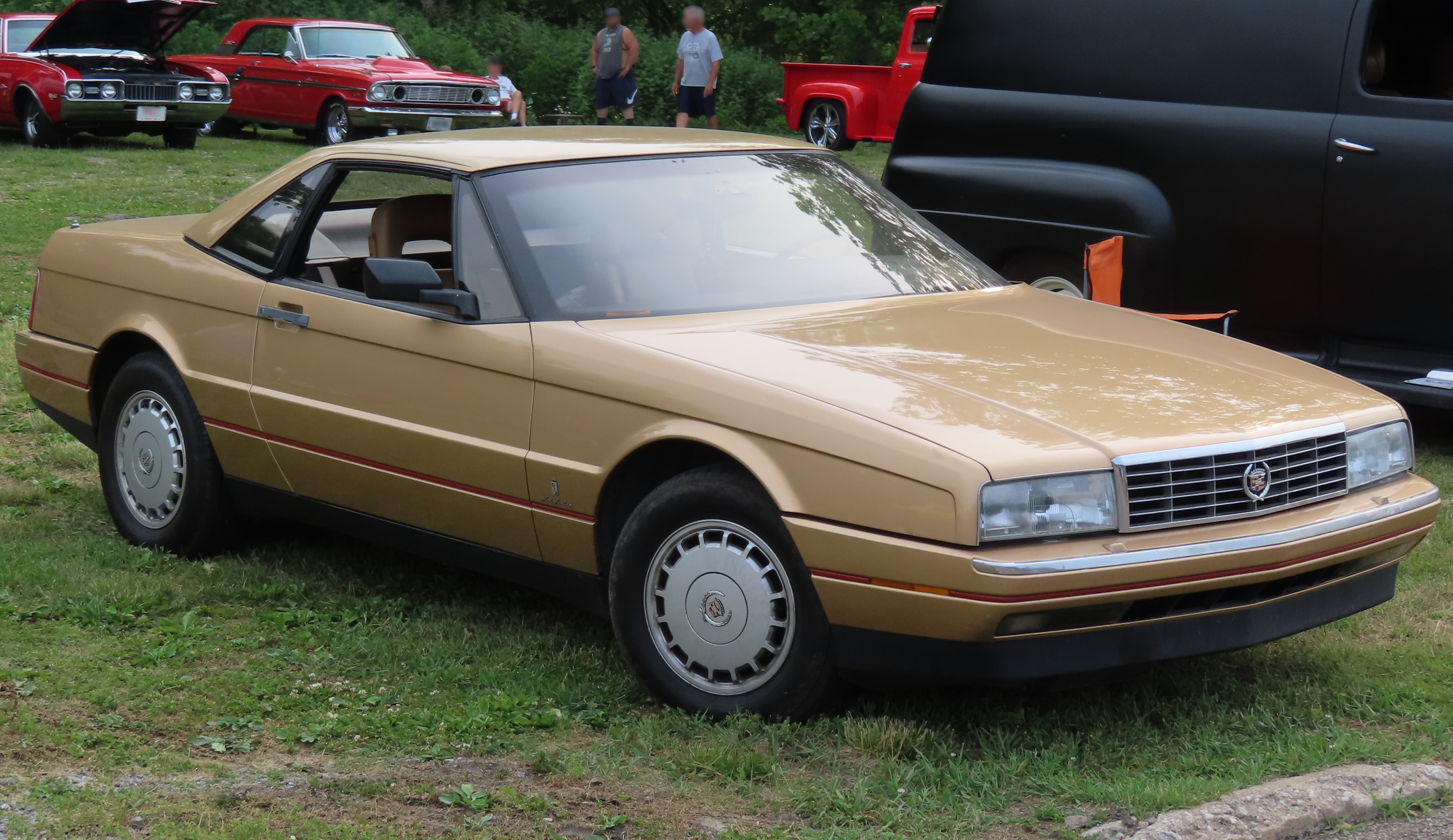
1987 Allanté

The front-wheel drive Allanté roadster had a transverse multi-port fuel injected variant of GM's aluminum 4.1 L (250 cu in) HT-Cadillac 4100 V8, along with roller valve lifters, high-flow cylinder heads, and a tuned intake manifold. The suspension was independent strut front and rear, with Bosch ABS III four-wheel disc brakes. A removable aluminum hardtop, Delco-GM/Bose Symphony Sound System (a $905 option on other Cadillacs), the industry's first power retractable AM/FM/Cellular Telephone antenna, and a complex lamp-out module that substituted an adjacent lamp for a burned-out bulb in the exterior lighting system until the dead one could be replaced were all standard. The only option was a cellular telephone installed in a lockable center console. The base price was $54,700 ($155,015 in 2025 dollars).

=== 1988 ===
The 1988 model year Allanté featured revised front seat headrests and a power decklid pulldown as standard equipment. Analog instruments, in place of the standard digital dash cluster, were now available as a no-charge option. The base price was raised to $56,533, with the cellular telephone still the only extra-cost option. In a comparison test by Popular Science magazine, the 1988 Allanté was ranked behind the Mercedes 560 SL, but ahead of the brand new Buick Reatta.

=== 1989 ===
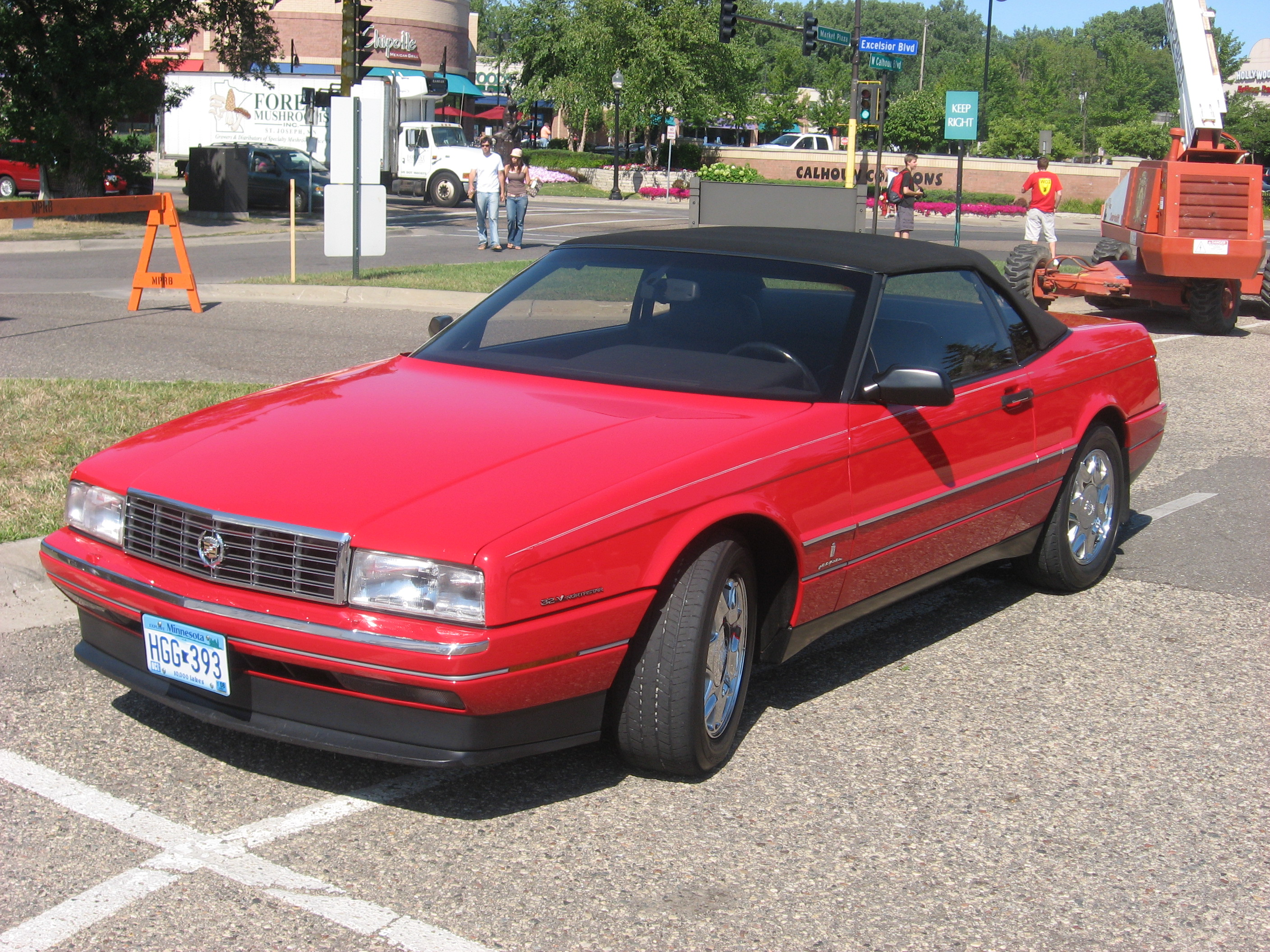
Cadillac Allanté

The 1989 model year base price rose to $57,183. The Allanté's engine, the new 4.5-litre (275 cu in) "High Technology" V8, produced 200 hp (149 kW; 203 PS), and with 270 lb⋅ft (366 N⋅m) of torque. Unlocking the trunk also unlocked the side doors if the key was rotated twice – similar to Mercedes-Benz and BMW. As a theft-deterrent, Allanté added GM's Pass Key (Personal Automotive Security System), using a resistor pellet within the ignition key to render the fuel system and starter inoperative if an incorrect ignition key was used. Allanté also received a new speed-sensitive damper system called Speed Dependent Damping Control, or SD²C. This system firmed the suspension at 25 mph (40 km/h) and again at 60 mph (97 km/h). The firmest setting was also used starting from a standstill until 5 mph (8.0 km/h). Another change was a variable-assist steering system.

=== 1990 ===
For the 1990 model year, a lower-priced ($53,050) companion model with a cloth convertible roof and without the removable aluminum hardtop was available. This version, including the hardtop, was $58,638. By midyear, prices were dropped to $57,813 for the hardtop/convertible and $51,500 for the convertible, including a $650 Gas Guzzler Tax and a $550 destination charge. The fully integrated cellular telephone, equipped from the factory on just 36 cars this year, was available for an additional $1,195. Allanté's bumper-to-bumper new car warranty, seven years and 100,000 mi (160,000 km), was three years longer than other Cadillacs, and an additional 50,000 mi (80,000 km) of coverage. Allanté owners also received a unique toll-free number for service or concerns. Headlamp washers and dual 10-way Recaro seating remained standard. A driver's side airbag was added to the leather-wrapped steering wheel, eliminating the telescoping steering wheel — which retained its tilt feature. The analog instrument cluster – introduced the previous year – was standard on the convertible (available at no extra cost on the hardtop/convertible), with 358 cars equipped with the analog cluster.

The power mirror control moved from the right of the steering column on the instrument panel to a new location on the upper end of the driver's door armrest. The power seat switches (previously mounted on the face of the seat base) were relocated to the lower side trim of the seat base facing the door panels. The 3-channel garage door opener base mounted on the header panel above the windshield was eliminated with introduction of a revised sun visor design. Traction control was added – the first front-wheel drive automobile with a V8 to be equipped as such. The system was designed to cut fuel to four cylinders to reduce power and optimize traction.

The electronically controlled shock absorbers were re-tuned to remain in "soft" mode up to 40 mph (64 km/h), up from 25 mph (40 km/h). A revised audio system allowed a CD and a cassette player to be added as standard equipment. Of the 2,523 built for 1990, five were exported – four to Canada and one to Germany.

=== 1991 ===
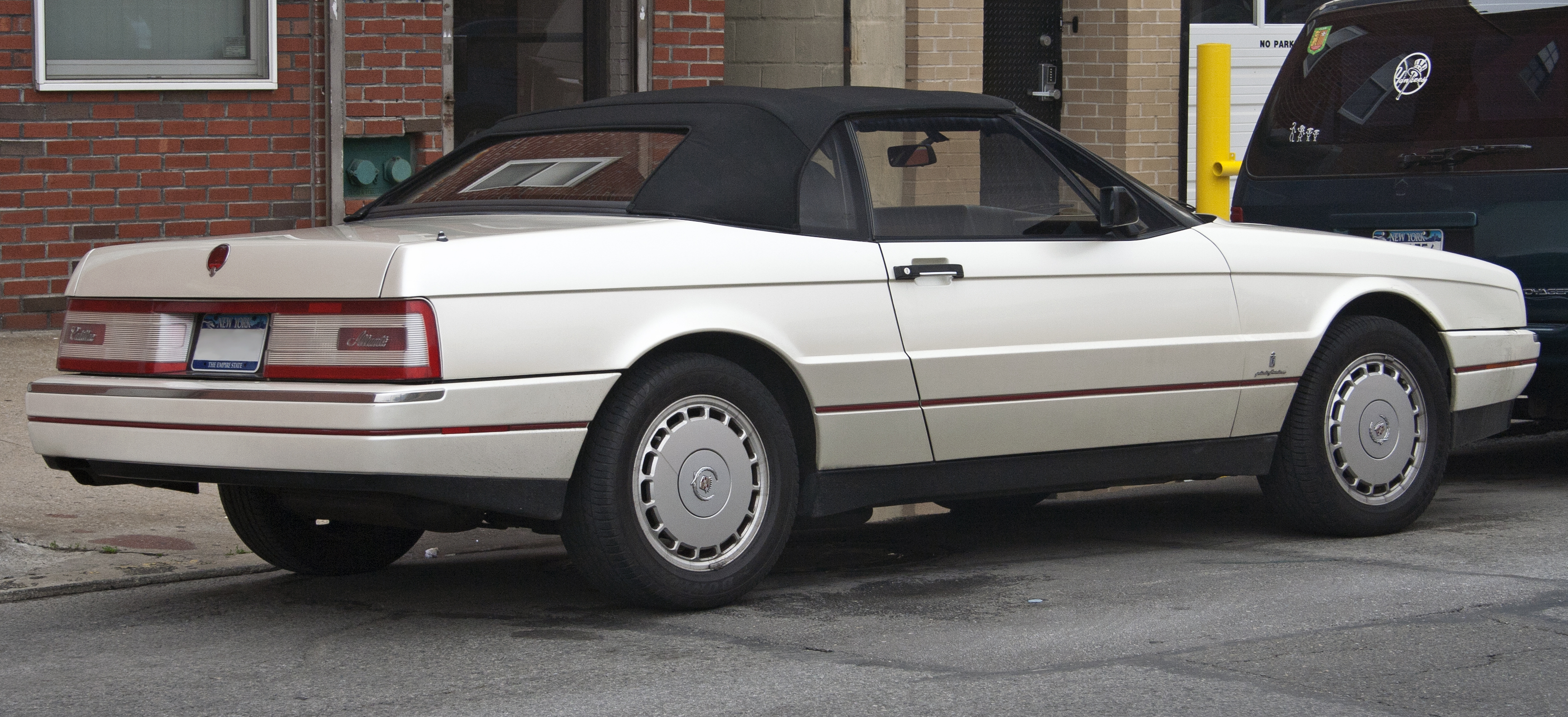
1991 Cadillac Allanté

For the 1991 model year, a power-latching mechanism was added for the convertible top, and redesigned the top stowage cover mechanism to address customer complaints. The Bose stereo system was upgraded to 200 watts, and the digital instrument cluster, featured in all but 275 Allanté models this year, was repriced (it was now a $495 option for the convertible model). Prices began at $57,260, although a midyear price drop brought the Allanté convertible down to $55,900 and the hardtop/convertible down to $61,450 (from $62,810). Allanté had 16.3 cubic feet of storage (when using the pass-through compartment into the cabin area). Of the 1,928 models produced for 1991, seven were manufactured for export – five to Canada, one to Italy, and another to Puerto Rico. Canadian models offered a kilometer-based instrument cluster, daytime running lamps, and an engine block heater as standard equipment. In contrast, the Italian model featured a list of European-mandated modifications, including breakaway side mirrors, specific European headlamps and turn signals, a front tow hook, rear fog lamps, deletion of the deck-lid mounted center brake light, a wet-arm windshield washer system, coolers for the power steering and automatic transmission fluids, and a revised steering column to compensate for the removal of the driver's airbag.

=== 1992 ===
The Allanté for 1992 was priced at $58,470 for the convertible and $64,090 for the hardtop/convertible. Both prices included the mandated gas guzzler tax, now $1,300. As it had been the custom for a few years, price drops were announced midyear: $57,170 for the convertible and $62,790 for the removable hardtop. The optional digital cluster was priced at $495 (available at no charge on the removable hardtop model). However, only 187 cars were equipped with the standard analog cluster this year. Also available on the convertible at extra cost was a pearl white paint group (option YL3) priced at $700 (a total of 443 made during 1992). 1992 was the last year of the multi-adjustable Recaro seating design. Four of the 1,698 produced this modelyear were exported to Canada. As with the previous year, the most popular exterior was 47U – Euro Red with 549 units, while the least popular was 49U – Light Blue Metallic with 15 finished in that color. Three shades of leather were available for the interior, the colors and their production totals: Charcoal (859), Natural Beige (652), Maroon (187), (50) Polo Green, and one Pearl Flax (O4U).

=== 1993 ===
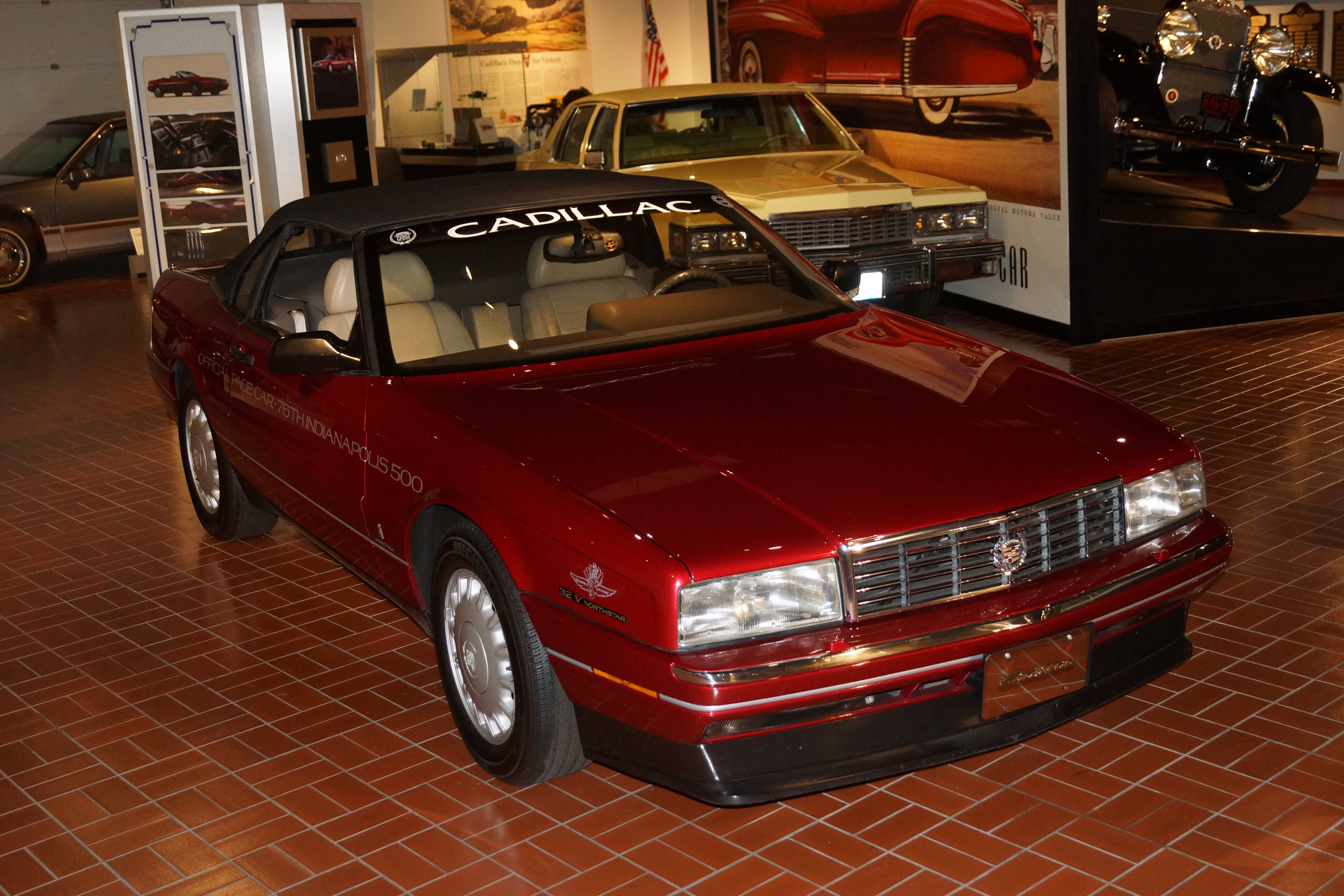
Indianapolis 500 Festival/Pace car

For the final 1993 model year, Allanté was offered in a single model configuration: as a soft-top convertible priced at $59,975 (not including a mandatory $1,700 gas guzzler tax for vehicles sold in the United States). Options included the removable 60.5 lb (27.4 kg) aluminum hardtop, LCD digital instrument cluster ($495) in place of the standard analog instruments, pearl coat paint option ($700, in Flax or Canyon Yellow, with Hawaiian Orchid added midyear) and chrome squeeze-cast aluminum wheels.

The 1993 models received the significantly more powerful 4.6 L (280.7 cu in) Northstar DOHC V8 engine rated at 295 hp (220 kW) at 5600 rpm and 290 ft⋅lb (393 N⋅m) of torque at 4400 rpm. A new unequal-length control arm rear suspension was introduced, shared with the Seville and Eldorado. To offset increased costs, the 200-watt Bose stereo was dropped in favor of GM's Delco "Premium Symphony Sound System"; the intelligent lighting module was eliminated; and 1993 models featured less expensive Lear-designed eight-way dual power seats, replacing the previous Recaro seats. Interior changes included the addition of an auto-dimming rearview mirror and a revised shifter grip. Other model year changes included Road Sensing Suspension, an active damper management system, revised disc brakes, revised variable-assist power steering rack, deeper front spoiler, and single-piece side windows, which eliminated the stationary forward vent window.

The 1993 Allanté was also chosen as the 1992 pace car for the 76th Indianapolis 500. The pace car was driven by Bobby Unser. Three modified 1993 Pace Cars had only the seat belts, lighted roll bar, and air intake modified from a stock production Allanté's. In addition to the official Allanté Pace cars provided for the race, thirty stock 1993 Allantés used as Festival/Pace Cars and 58 stock 1992 Allanté Festival/Pace cars used by drivers and crews at the opening parade and the race's closing. Al Unser Jr's 1993 Allanté Festival/Pace car was featured at the 2012 and 2013 Keel's & Wheel's Concours D’Elegance in Seabrook, Texas. Bobby Unser was Grand Marshal in 2012, and Al Unser Jr. was Grand Marshal in 2013.

Production reached 4,670 for the 1993 model year, with 85 shipped to Canada and 30 were exported overseas: France (1), Austria (2), Belgium (5), Germany (5), Switzerland (6), and Japan (11).

== Discontinuation ==
Despite a scheduled facelift for the model, the last Allanté built was flown from Turin, Italy, on July 2, 1993, and completed at Detroit-Hamtramck 14 days later. With 21,430 built, assemblies averaged just a little more than 3,000 a year throughout the car's lifetime. Production officially ended on July 16, 1993.

== Specifications ==
Year	Engine	Transmission	Power	Torque	0–60 mph (97 km/h) (s)	0–100 mph (161 km/h) (s)	Standing 1/4 mile (0-400m) (s)	Top speed	Braking from 70 mph (113 km/h)
1987–1988	4.1 L (250.2 cu in) HT-4100 V8	4-speed F-7 auto	170 hp (127 kW)	235 ft⋅lb (319 N⋅m)	9.3		17.4		
1989–1992	4.5 L (274.6 cu in) HT-4500 V8	4-speed F-7 auto	200 hp (149 kW)	270 ft⋅lb (366 N⋅m)	7.9	26.3	16.3 at 83 mph (134 km/h)	122 mph (196 km/h)	183 ft (56 m)
1993	4.6 L (280.7 cu in) Northstar L37 V8	4-speed 4T80-E auto	295 hp (220 kW)	290 ft⋅lb (393 N⋅m)	6.4	17.7	15.0 at 93 mph (150 km/h)	140 mph (225 km/h)	189 ft (58 m)

== Production numbers ==
Model Year	Total Production
1987	3,363
1988	2,569
1989	3,296
1990	3,101
1991	2,500
1992	1,931
1993	4,670
TOTAL	21,430

Pininfarina production records state that 21,395 bodies were made from 1986 to 1993.

== See also ==
- Chrysler TC by Maserati
