= Buick Reatta =

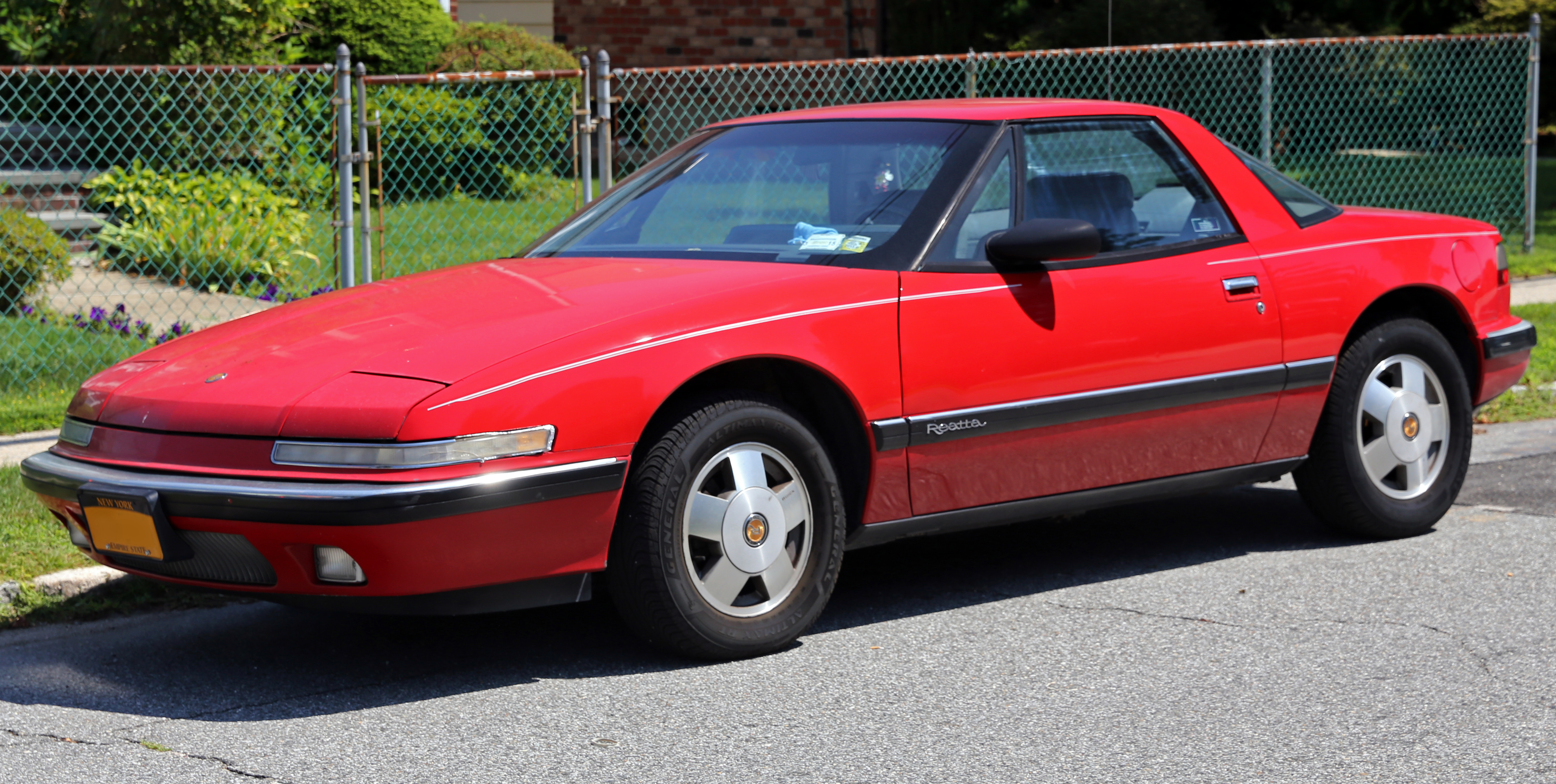
- 1988 Buick Reatta coupe

Overview
- Manufacturer: General Motors
- Production: 1988–1991
- Assembly: United States: Lansing, Michigan (Lansing Craft Center)
- Designer: Dave McIntosh (1983)

Body and chassis
- Class: Grand tourer/Sports car
- Body style: 1988–91: 2-door coupe 1990–91: 2-door convertible
- Layout: Transverse front-engine, front-wheel drive
- Platform: E-body
- Chassis: unibody
- Related: Buick Riviera; Oldsmobile Toronado; Cadillac Eldorado

Powertrain
- Engine: 1988–90: 3.8 L LN3 Buick V6; 1991: 3.8 L L27 Buick V6
- Transmission: 1988–89: 4-sp 440T-4 automatic 1990: 4-sp 4T60 automatic 1991: 4-sp 4T60-E automatic

Dimensions
- Wheelbase: 98.5 in (2,502 mm)
- Length: 183.7 in (4,666 mm)
- Width: 73.0 in (1,854 mm)
- Height: 1988–89: 51.2 in (1,300 mm); 1990–91: 51.6 in (1,311 mm)
- Curb weight: 3,377 lb (1,532 kg); 3,392 lb (1,539 kg)

The Buick Reatta is a low-volume transverse front-engine, front-wheel drive, two-door, two-seater grand tourer manufactured and marketed by Buick as a coupe (1988–1991) and convertible (1990–1991) — both featuring a 3.8 liter V6 engine and shortened version of the GM E platform, shared with the seventh generation Buick Riviera.

As Buick's first two-seater and its first convertible since the 1985 Riviera, the Reatta was manufactured in a highly specialized assembly program at the Reatta Craft Center (later known as the Lansing Craft Center) in Lansing, Michigan—achieving production of over 21,000 units in four years.

== Overview ==
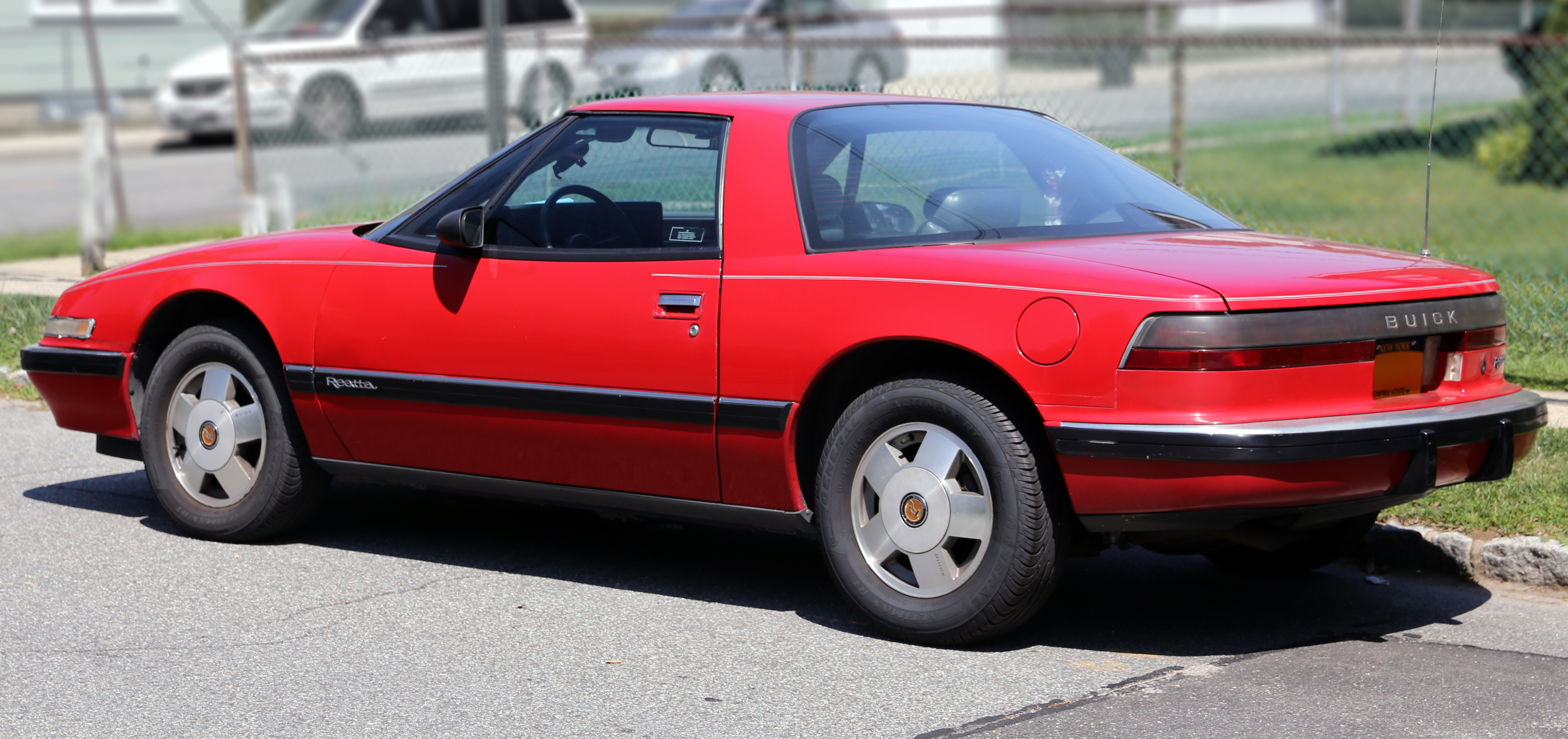
Rear view (1988 coupe)

For the Reatta's manufacture at the Reatta Craft Center, specialized teams of workers assembled the car at a series of stations rather than on a conventional assembly line. After a team had completed their portion of the assembly, the car would be moved by robots to the next station. Paintwork was performed on site under subcontract to PPG Industries.

The Reatta used GM's transverse Buick 3800 V6 with 165–170 hp (123–127 kW) and 210–220 lb·ft (285–298 N·m) of torque with the highest output in the last year of production. The car used a fully independent suspension, 4 wheel disc brakes with ABS, and front wheel drive. Top speed was electronically limited to 125 mph (201 km/h). The Reatta was rated at 18 mpg (13.1 L/100 km) in the city and 27 mpg (8.7 L/100 km) on the highway.

Intended as a halo car for Buick, production was projected at 20,000 Reattas annually, and was available while the Cadillac Allanté and Pontiac Fiero were also available. GM announced the end of production in early 1991.

== Features ==
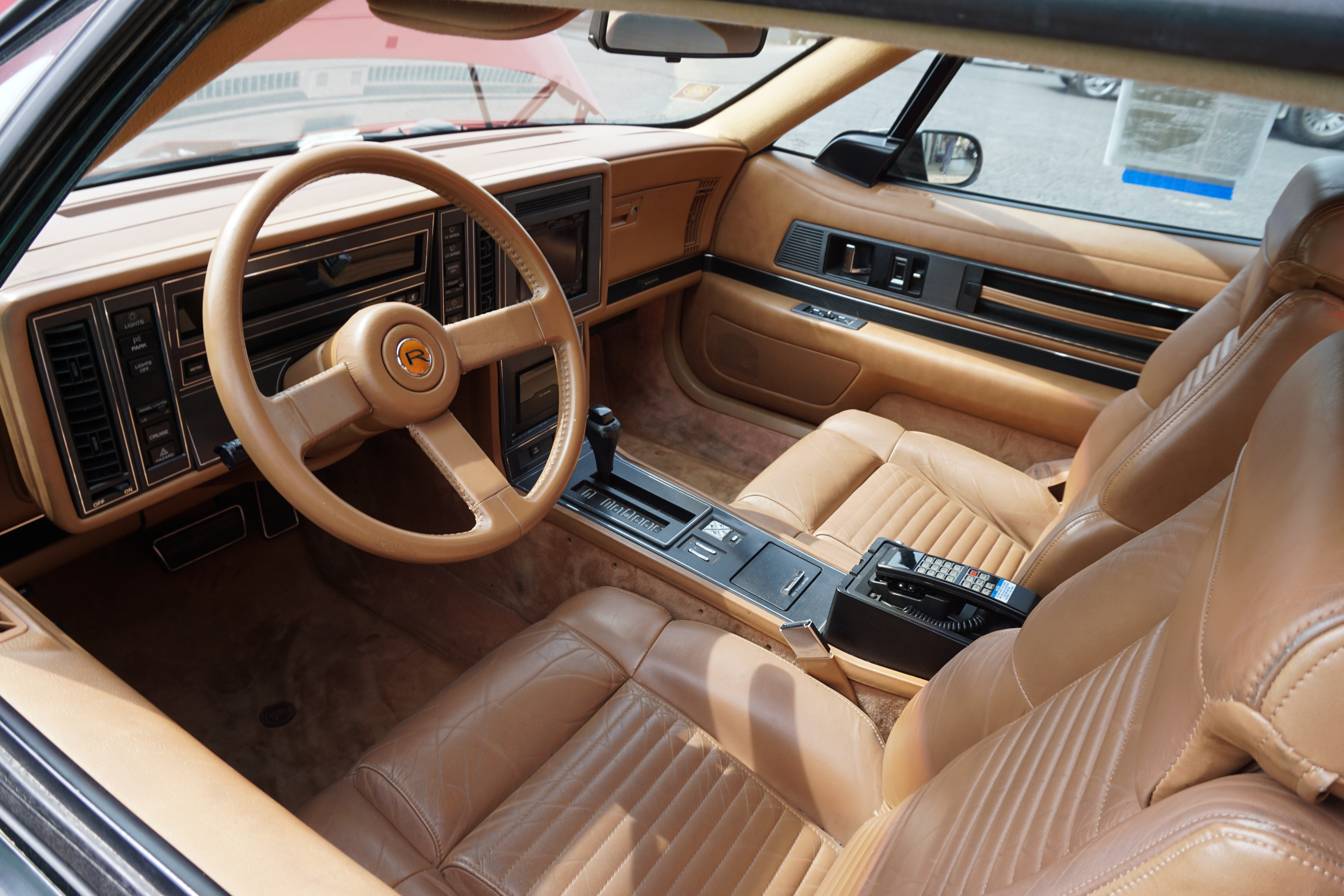
1989 Buick Reatta coupe interior

The Reatta featured twin bucket seats with a storage area behind the seats featuring two lockable bins and a lockable access hatch to the rear trunk. At introduction, options included 16-way power seats in lieu of 6-way power seats, side moldings in either black or body color and pinstripe delete. A sunroof became optional in late 1988, and in 1989 keyless entry was added as a standard feature. The 1988 listed retail price was $25,000 ($68,057 in 2025 dollars).

The Reatta had the distinction of being Buick's only car with pop-up headlamps with the entire headlamp assembly moving up and down. The other Buick cars with hidden headlamps, the Riviera (1965–1969) and the Skyhawk (1987–1989 for certain trim levels), had fixed headlamps hidden behind moveable covers.

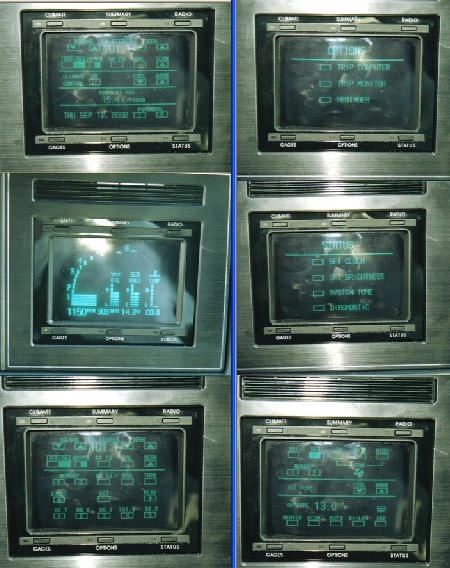
Buick Graphic Control

Initially (1988–89), the Reatta featured a touchscreen computer interface, marketed as the Electronic Control Center (ECC), that included radio and climate control functions, date reminder, trip computer and user-configurable overspeed alarm, as well as diagnostic access to the vehicle's electronic systems and sensors. The Reatta was the second car to ever feature a touchscreen after the 1986 Buick Riviera. Later models were equipped with conventional push-button stereo and climate controls. The new system eliminated the trip computer functionality and the climate control buttons could access diagnostic information, replacing the diagnostic scanner capability formerly provided by the touchscreen.

In 1990, the interior was redesigned, adding a driver's airbag and an optional CD player. In 1991, the "L27" 3800 engine and 4T60-E transmission replaced the "LN3" and hydraulic 4T60 units and the Reatta received a new ABS system, new 16" wheels, automatic headlamps and a cup holder built into the armrest.

Each Reatta included a leather book containing the owner's manual and a pen. In 1990 and 1991, a zippered owner's folio was included holding the owner's manual, pen, flashlight and tire gauge, as well as a Craftsman's Log with the signatures of the supervisors for the car's assembly.

In 1988, approximately fifty-five examples were designated "Select Sixties" and allocated to Buick's top 60 dealers. The models, internally designated model X22, featured a black exterior, tan interior, and unique "Select Sixty" hood emblems.

In 1990, the Select Sixty program was repeated, with 65 white convertibles including special emblems, and a flame red interior with white bucket seats, white 16-inch wheels, and cup holder.

== Convertible ==
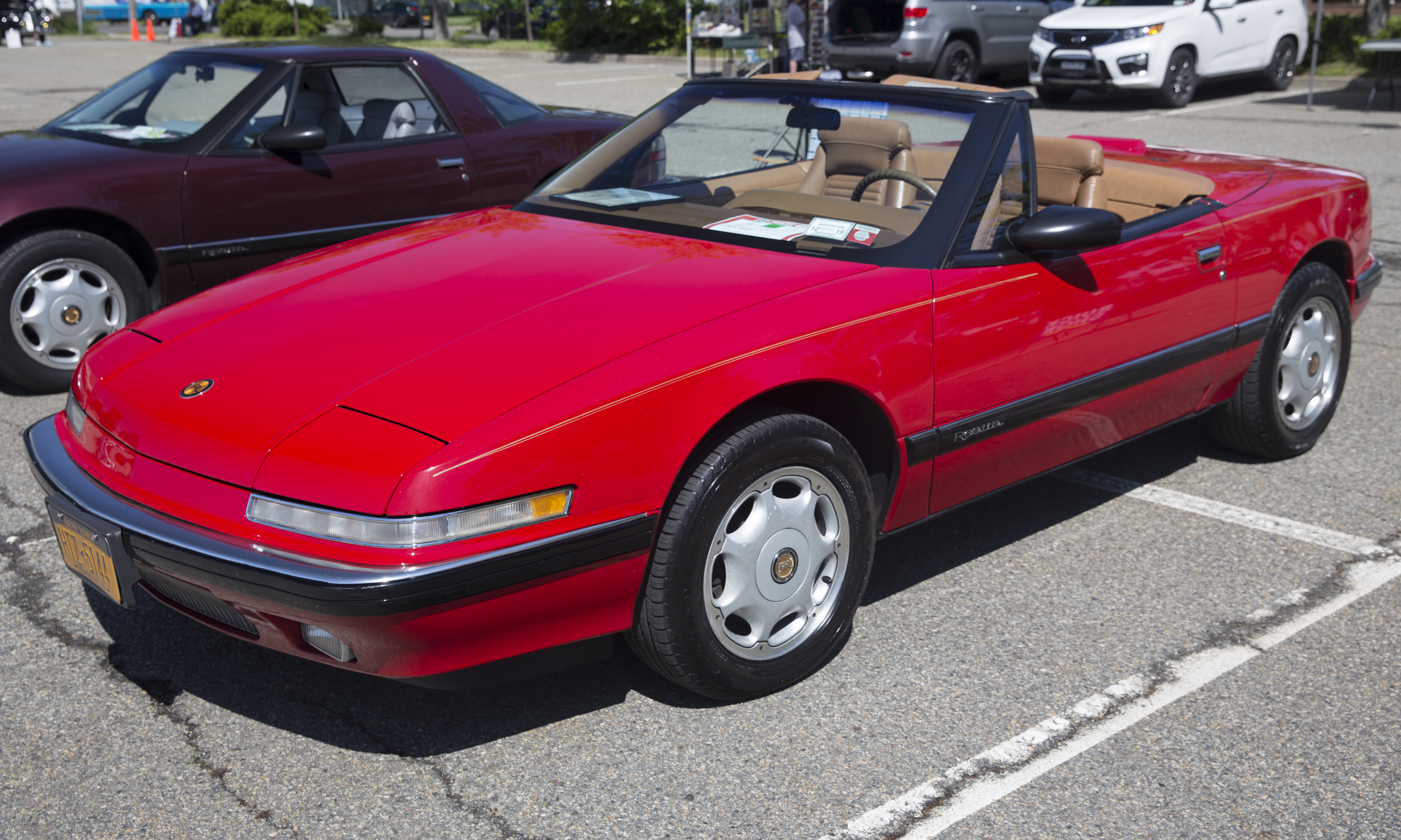
1991 Buick Reatta convertible

After a delayed introduction due to design difficulties, Buick introduced the convertible Reatta in 1990 with a manually operated top designed by ASC, available in vinyl or cloth with a glass rear window and electric defroster. When retracted, the top was protected by a rigid tonneau cover. The 1991 models featured power pull-down motors to assist in tightening the rear bow of the top to the tonneau cover.

A Buick convertible would not be offered again until the four-seat Buick Cascada debuted in 2016.

== Production ==
Buick Reatta emblem

The first pilot car was finished at the Reatta Craft Centre in December 1986. Series production began in January 1988 and ended on May 10, 1991. The original car was sometimes referred to as a "1988½ model year", owing to its January introduction.

Year	4EC97 Coupe	4EC67 Convertible	Total	Notes
1988	4,708	0	4,708	First year. Early '88s had suede seat bolsters. Only year for remote glove box
1989	7,009	0	7,009	Larger hood ornament, keyless entry, sunroof option (mid-88 addition)
1990	6,383	2,132	8,515	First year of the convertible. Revised interior with new instrument panel, console, and steering wheel-mounted airbag. Select Sixty model gets 16 inch wheels.
1991	1,214	305	1,519	16 inch wheels, tuned-port "L-code" engine and electronically controlled transmission, and a new ABS system. Twilight Sentinel, and a cup holder
Total:			21,751	
