= Chevrolet SS (concept car) =

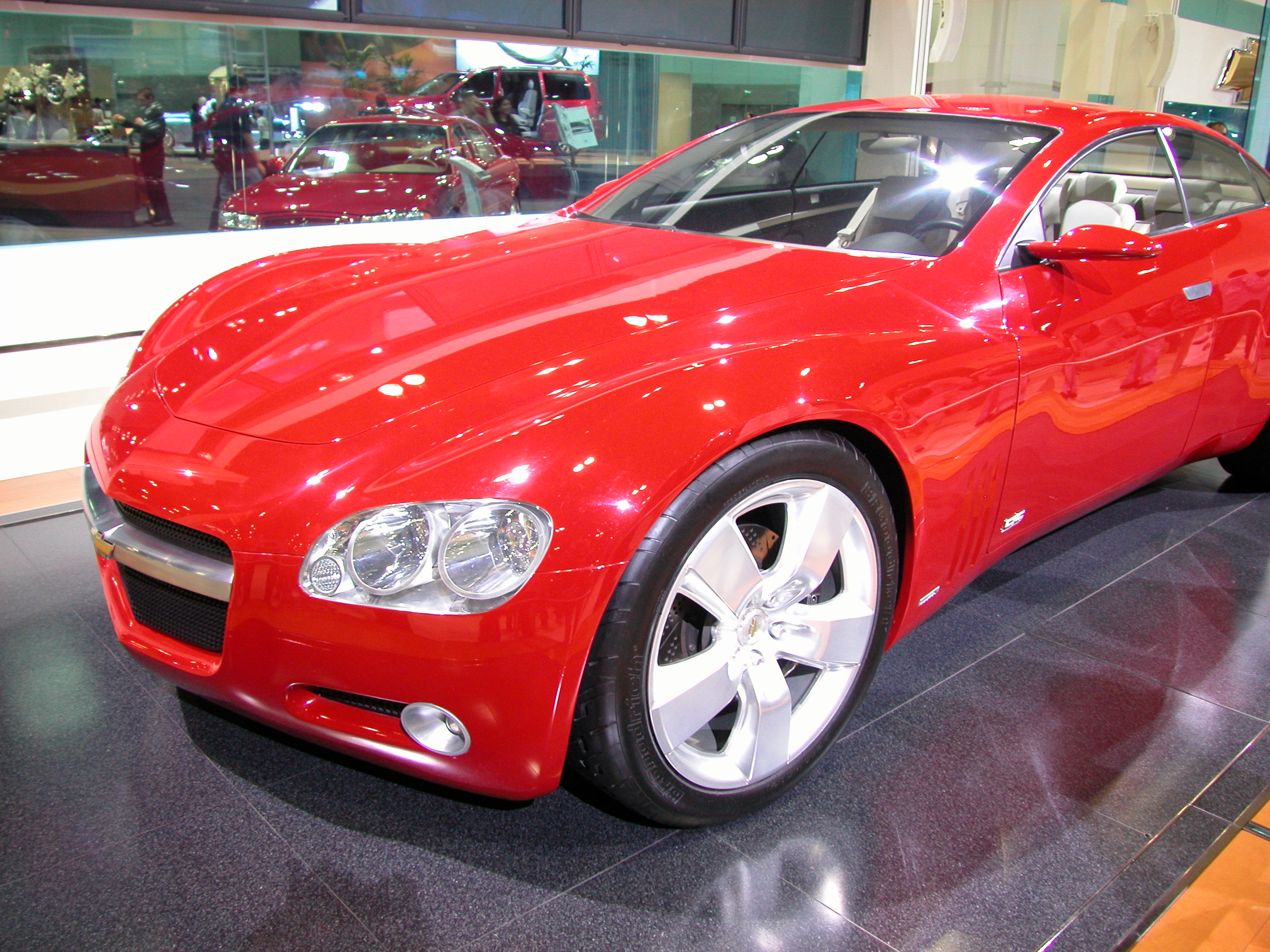

Overview
- Manufacturer: Chevrolet (General Motors)
- Production: 2003 (Concept car)
- Designer: Franz von Holzhausen

Body and chassis
- Class: Concept car
- Body style: 4-door fastback sedan
- Layout: FR layout
- Related: Chevrolet SSR

Powertrain
- Engine: 6.0 L V8
- Transmission: Hydramatic 4L65-E 4-speed electronically controlled automatic

Dimensions
- Length: 198.9 in (5,052 mm)
- Width: 76 in (1,930 mm)
- Height: 53 in (1,346 mm)
- Curb weight: 3,660 lb (1,660 kg)

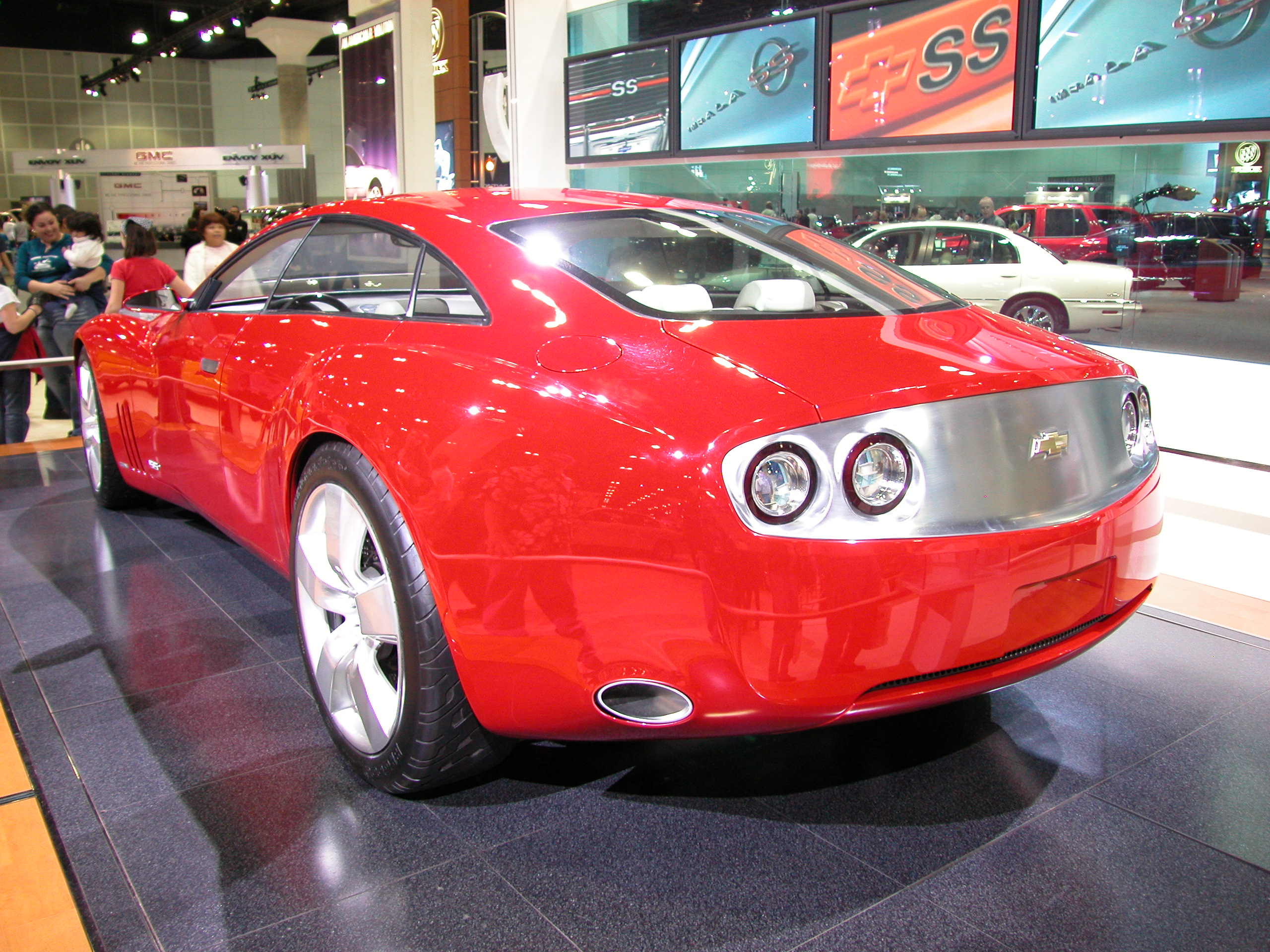
Rear view

The Chevrolet SS was a concept car designed, branded, and built by Chevrolet. It was introduced at the 2003 North American International Auto Show, but was never approved for official production.
