= Chevrolet SSR =

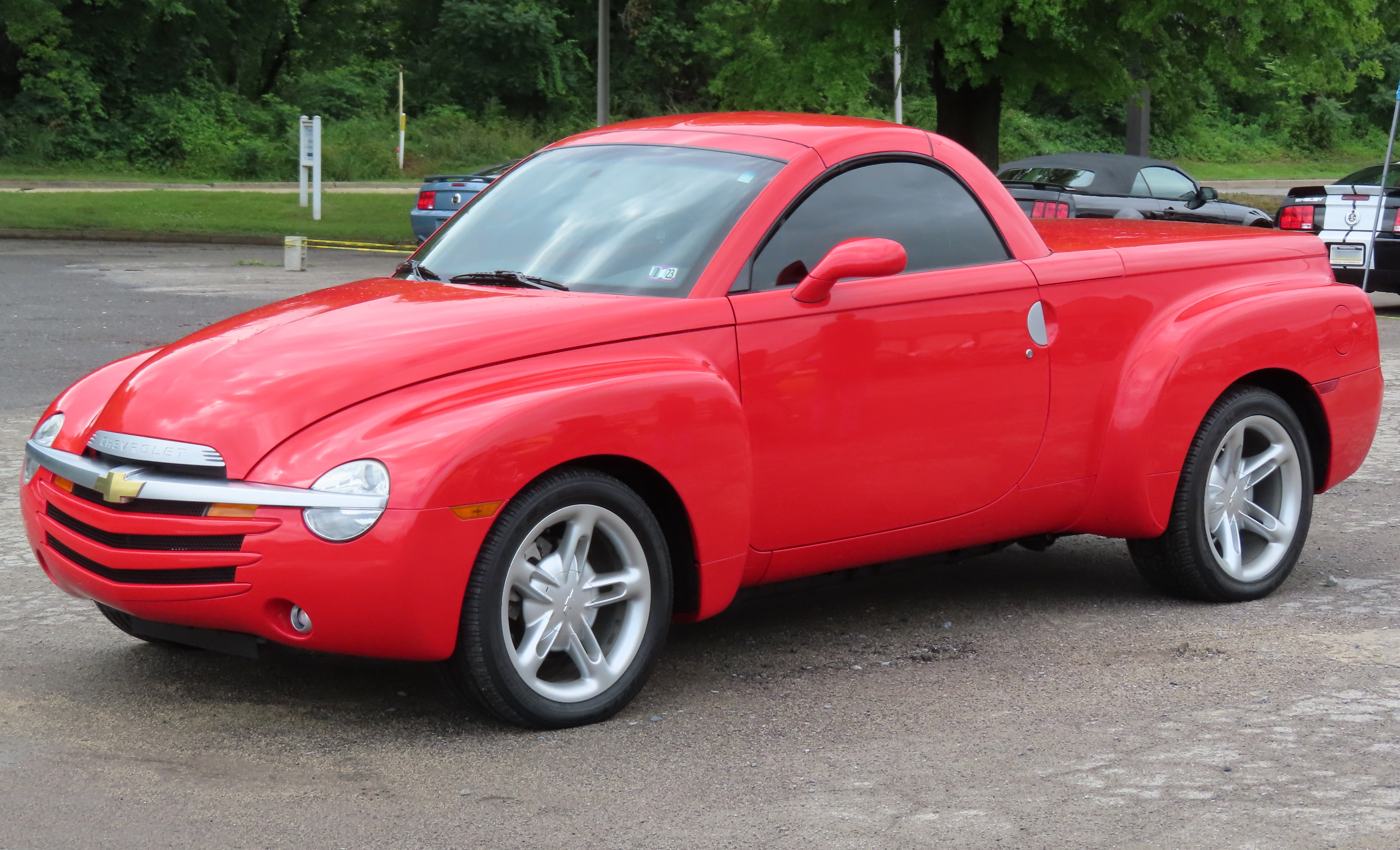

Overview
- Manufacturer: Chevrolet
- Production: 2003 – March 2006
- Model years: 2003–2006
- Assembly: United States: Lansing, Michigan (Lansing Craft Center)
- Designer: Bill Davis (Design Director); Brian Baker (Design Manager); Doug Ungemach (Concept); Glen Durmisevich (Exterior); Andre Hudson (Interior)

Body and chassis
- Class: Pickup truck
- Body style: 2-door roadster utility
- Layout: Front-engine, rear-wheel drive
- Platform: GM GMT368 platform
- Chassis: Body-on-frame
- Related: Chevrolet TrailBlazer; GMC Envoy; Oldsmobile Bravada; Buick Rainier; Isuzu Ascender; Saab 9-7X

Powertrain
- Engine: Gasoline: 2003–2004: 5.3 L LM4 V8; 2005–2006: 6.0 L LS2 V8
- Transmission: 2003–2004: 4-speed 4L60-E automatic; 2005–2006: 4-speed 4L65-E automatic; 2005–2006: 6-speed Tremec T-56 manual

Dimensions
- Wheelbase: 116.0 in (2,946 mm)
- Length: 2003–2005: 191.4 in (4,862 mm); 2006: 191.5 in (4,864 mm)
- Width: 78.6 in (1,996 mm)
- Height: 2003–2005: 64.2 in (1,631 mm); 2006: 63.8 in (1,621 mm)

The Chevrolet SSR (an initialism for Super Sport Roadster) is a retro-styled pickup truck with a retractable hardtop manufactured by Chevrolet from 2003 to 2006. The design was inspired by the Chevrolet Advance Design series of trucks.

== Design ==
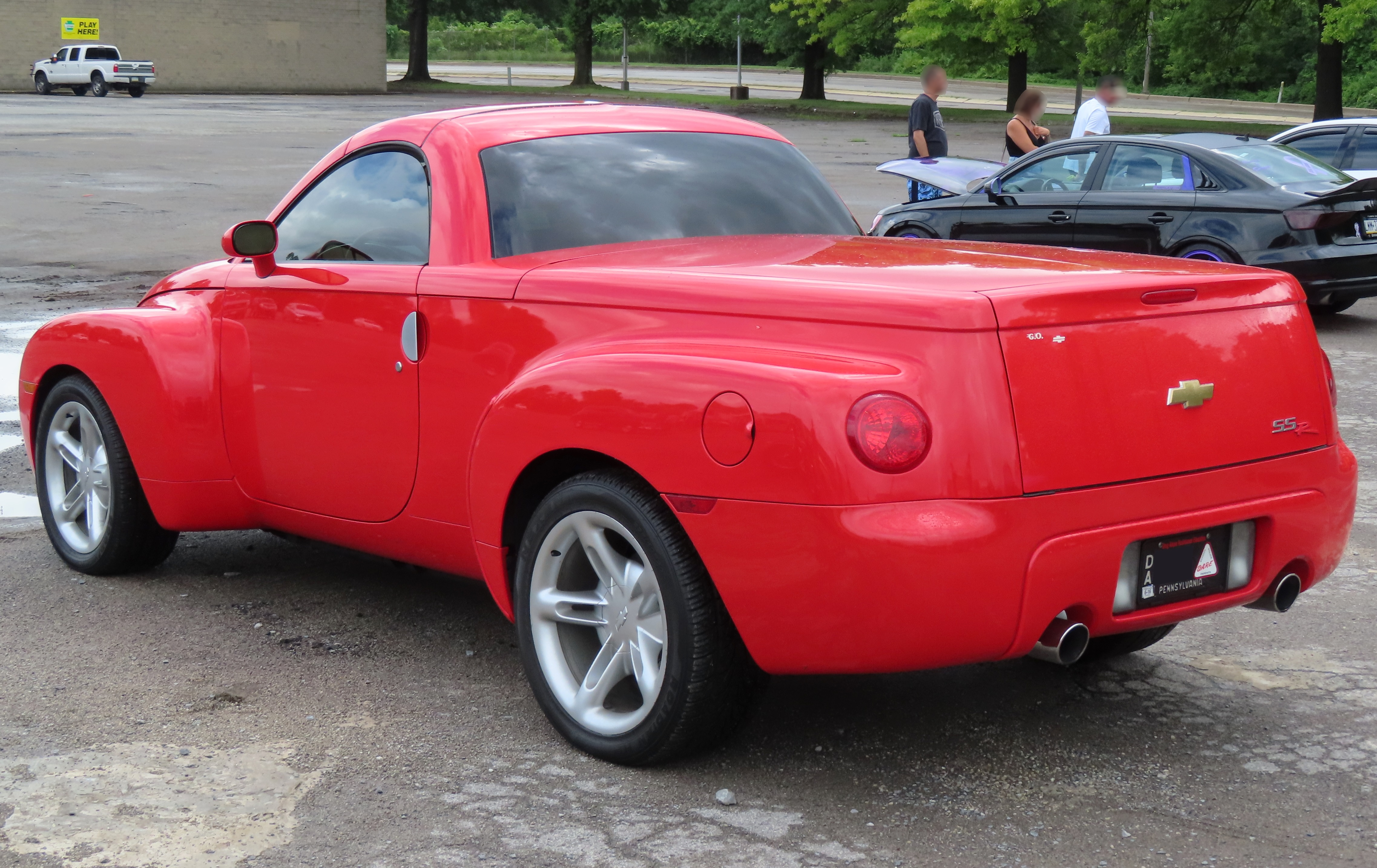
Rear view

The SSR's design was inspired by the 1947–1955 Chevrolet Advance Design trucks. The frame of the vehicle is a version of the GMT360 platform that GM built exclusively for the SSR, named the GMT368. The SSR featured a bespoke steel-body retractable hardtop, developed with input from Karmann and engineered and supplied by ASC. The majority of body panels on the truck are steel. The fenders required a specially developed deep-draw stamping process, with a draw of 18 inches (46 cm) for the front fenders and 10 inches (25 cm) for the rear. The production model was based on the SuperSport Roadster concept car shown at the 2000 Detroit Auto Show. In contrast to the production vehicle, this concept car used the chassis from the Chevrolet S-10 pickup.

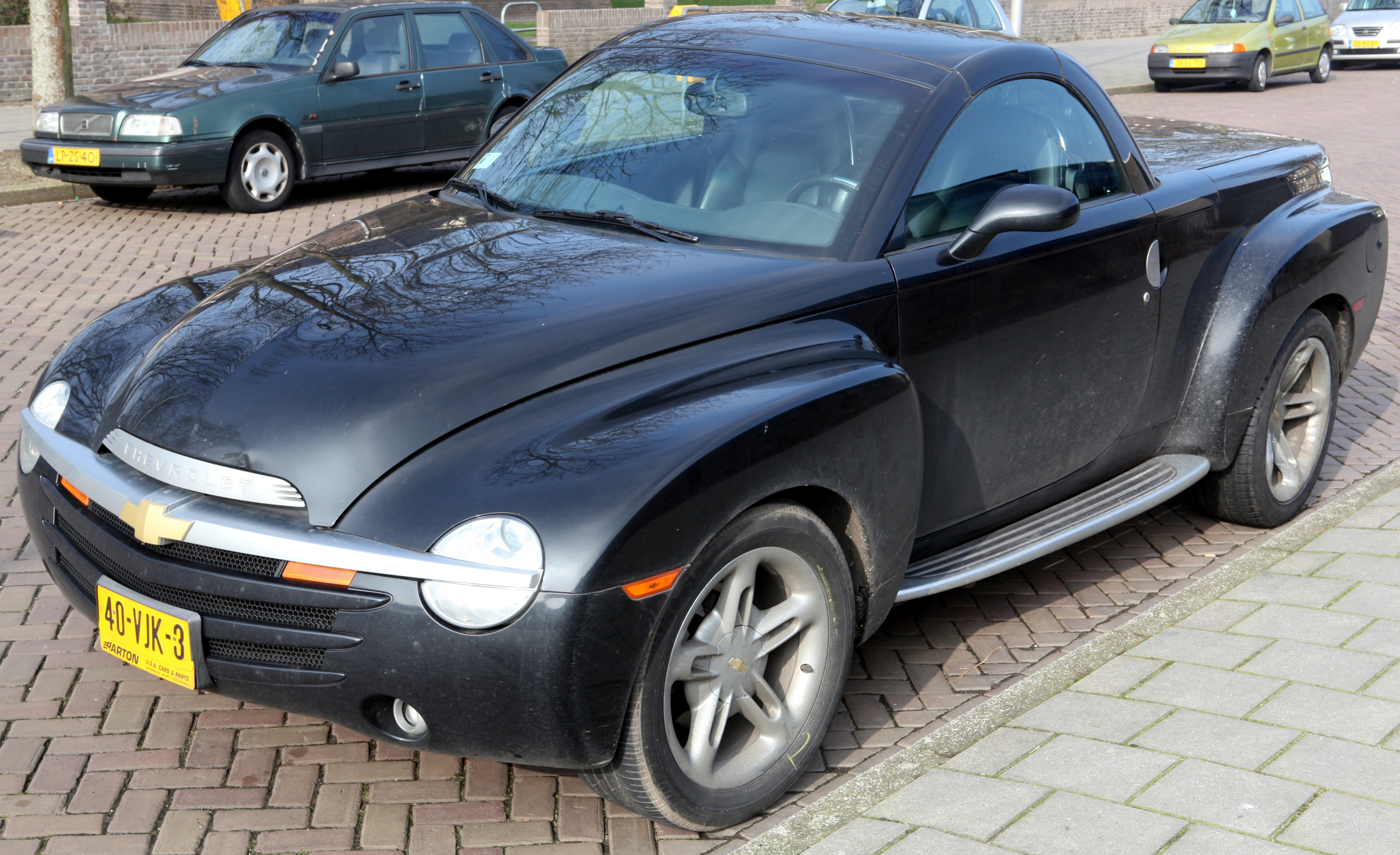
Chevrolet SSR

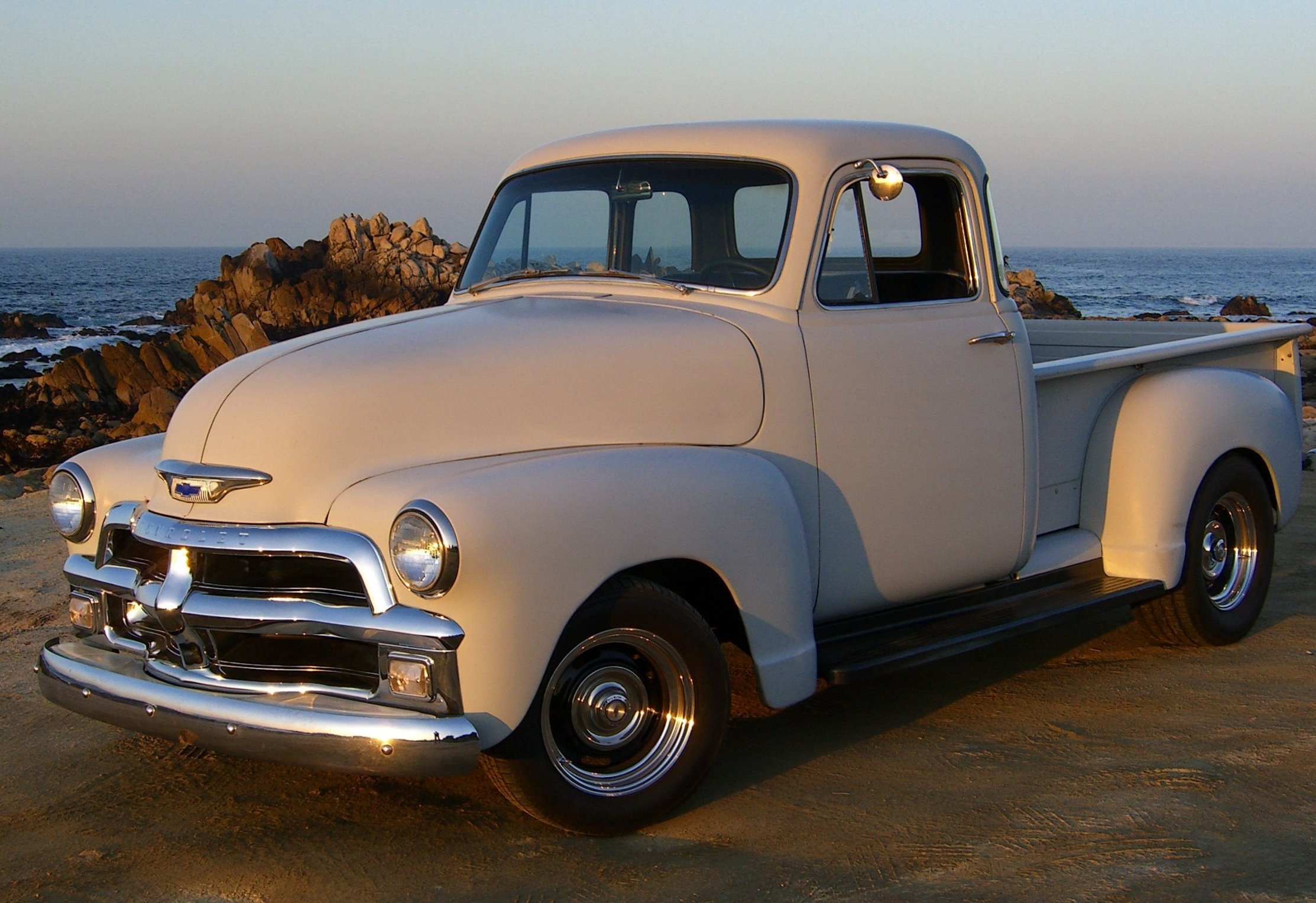
1954 Chevrolet Advance Design pickup

== Features ==
=== Options ===
The SSR was offered with several accessory options, some included in trim packages and others available separately. Any SSR whose trim package did not include them could have them added when ordered. Available options included carpeted floor mats, carpeted floor mats with embroidered SSR logo, brushed-nickel-plated engine cover insert marketed as satin chrome, painted running boards color matched to satin chrome, front license plate bracket, cockpit mesh windbreak, trailering hitch, carpeted rear cargo compartment with accent trim in imitation oak wood veneer, carpeted rear cargo compartment with accent trim in brushed aluminum, cargo compartment cargo net and crossbar, painted bedside cover panels for cargo cover removal color-matched to body color, wall-mounted cargo-cover storage system, and car cover embroidered with the SSR logo. Despite the services being provided by GM during all production years, OnStar in-vehicle telematics system, and the related XM Satellite Radio service, were never offered on any SSR sold to the public.

For the 2003 model year, a set of inboard panniers marketed as locking dual hard shell side-saddle storage containers were available for the cargo compartment. Late into the 2004 model year, the option was made available to order a brushed-nickel-plated auxiliary instrumentation gauge pod marketed as satin chrome. The gauges in all early gauge pods display, from left to right, battery voltmeter, fuel consumption rate in gallons per hour, and transmission internal thermometer in Fahrenheit. This gauge pod is compatible with every 2003 and 2004 model year SSR, and is not functionally compatible with any 2005 or 2006 model year SSR. For the 2005 model year, a body-color-painted auxiliary instrumentation gauge pod was available alongside the satin chrome auxiliary instrumentation gauge pod. Additionally, the gauges in all subsequent gauge pods were updated to display, from left to right, battery voltmeter, crankshaft torque in pound-feet, and an outside ambient air thermometer in Fahrenheit. This gauge pod is compatible with every 2005 and 2006 model year SSR, and is not functionally compatible with any 2003 or 2004 model year SSR. Additional new options for the 2005 model year included body-color-painted engine cover insert and body-color-painted running boards. For the 2006 model year, the option was discontinued for inboard panniers marketed as locking dual hard-shell side-saddle storage containers, the option was publicly introduced for inboard panniers marketed as dual soft-shell side-saddle storage bags, and a soft-shell cargo organizer for the front wall of the cargo compartment was available for the first time. The option for a Bright Chrome auxiliary instrumentation gauge pod was made available for only the 3SS/1SC Trim Package. For the 2006 model year, seven two-tone paint color options were made available for the SSR. Additionally, the 2006 SSR featured GM Mark of Excellence emblems on the fenders.

=== Standard equipment ===
SSR interior

Every SSR was equipped with ebony black interior cosmetic panels and moisture-resistant carpeted flooring for the interior, as well as ebony black leather-trimmed bucket seats and leather-wrapped steering wheel. Interior standard equipment on every SSR included keyless entry, power windows and power door locks, electronic driver information center, AM/FM radio with integrated single-disc CD player, six-speaker GM sound system, manually adjustable analog rearview mirror, manually adjustable bucket seats, tilt-adjustable steering wheel with radio controls and driver information controls, cruise control, dual-zone air conditioning, auxiliary gauge pod connections integrated into the interior wiring harness, driver front and side SRS airbags, passenger front and side SRS airbags, and brushed-nickel-plated accent trim marketed as satin chrome. Exterior standard equipment on every SSR included daytime running lights, front fog lights, mast antenna integrated into the windshield, cast-aluminum wheels sized at 19-inch (48 cm) front and 20-inch (51 cm) rear, tinted windows, power hydraulic retractable-hardtop roof, body-colored roof compartment tonneau cover, molded plastic rear cargo compartment with body-colored rear cargo cover, and brushed-nickel-plated formal accessories marketed as satin chrome. Mechanical standard equipment on every SSR included power steering, front-engine rear-wheel-drive powertrain, rear axle Zexel Torsen torque-sensing limited-slip locking differential, four wheel disc brakes, trailering hitch socket, and trailering equipment connections integrated into the rear wiring harness. Standard equipment on every SSR produced for the Z49 Canadian market is nearly identical to the US market vehicles, with minute label differences around the vehicle, and most visibly, the default maximum reading 140 MPH US market speedometer faceplate is replaced by the optional U19 maximum reading 220 KPH speedometer faceplate. The Z49 Canadian market SSR Monroney Labels were graphically entirely different from the default US market SSR Monroney Labels. The Z49 designation was not explicitly stated on Canadian market SSR Monroney Labels, as the designation was inherent to the market.

=== 1SA/1SS ===
The 1SA Trim Package offered nothing more than the preceding standard equipment. The 1SA was available during the 2003–2005 model years in all markets. The 1SS Trim Package was introduced in 2006, as a rebrand of the 1SA in the US market, to more adequately align with the incoming Chevrolet trim nomenclature. The 1SS was available during only the 2006 model year, and in only the US market. As documented by GM on the Monroney Labels of Z49 vehicles, the Canadian market Z49 SSR retained the 1SA trim level for the 2006 model year.

=== 1SB/2SS ===
The 1SB Trim Package was available during the 2003–2005 model years in all markets. The 2SS Trim Package was introduced in 2006, as a rebrand of the 1SB in the US market, to more adequately align with the incoming Chevrolet trim nomenclature. The 2SS was available during only the 2006 model year, and in only the US market. As documented by GM on the Monroney Labels of Z49 vehicles, the Canadian market Z49 SSR retained the 1SB trim level for the 2006 model year. The 1SB/2SS Trim Package maintained all 1SA/1SS standard equipment, with the collective interchange of comfort upgrades, including the replacement of the radio head unit and integrated single-disc CD player with a stereo head unit and integrated selectable 6-disc CD player, the replacement of the GM sound system with a six speaker Bose premium audio installation, the replacement of the analog rearview mirror with a light-sensitive auto-dimming rearview mirror containing integrated dual reading lights and integrated garage door remote, the replacement of the driver-side exterior analog mirror with a light-sensitive auto-dimming mirror, the replacement of manually adjustable bucket seats with heated, electronically adjustable bucket seats retaining dual driver memory, and the addition of the previously available upgrade of a brushed-nickel-plated engine cover insert marketed as satin chrome. The addition of this engine cover insert was discontinued for the 2006 model year. For the 2005 model year and the 2006 model year, the 1SB/2SS Trim Package unlocked the ability to furnish the vehicle with the VXM Body Color Accent Package, which applied the replacement of the satin chrome matched painted running boards, brushed-nickel satin chrome engine cover insert, optional brushed-nickel satin chrome auxiliary instrumentation gauge pod, and imitation oak wood veneer cargo compartment accent trim, with running boards, engine cover insert, auxiliary instrumentation gauge pod, and cargo compartment accent trim, each finished in the paint code identical to the exterior of the ordered SSR. For the 2006 model year, the 1SB/2SS Trim Package unlocked the ability to furnish the vehicle with the VYJ Bright Chrome Package, which applied the replacement of the interior brushed-nickel satin chrome accent trim and exterior brushed-nickel satin chrome formal accessories with interior accent trim and exterior formal accessories plated with decorative genuine chrome polished to a mirror reflective finish.

=== 3SS/1SC ===
The 3SS Trim Package was introduced in 2006, as an echelon above the newly rebranded 2SS in the US market. The 3SS was available during only the 2006 model year, and in only the US market. As documented by GM on the Monroney Labels of Z49 vehicles, Canadian market Z49 SSRs introduced the 1SC Trim Package for the 2006 model year, as an echelon above the existing 1SB. The 1SC was available during only the 2006 model year, and in only the Canadian market.

The 3SS/1SC Trim Package maintained all 1SS/1SA standard equipment, maintained all comfort upgrades inherent to the 2SS/1SB Trim Package, and accumulated the inherent addition of the previously optional painted running boards color matched to satin chrome on the exterior, and a previously optional brushed-nickel satin chrome auxiliary instrumentation gauge pod in the interior. As with the preceding trim, for the 2006 model year, the 3SS/1SC Trim Package also unlocked the ability to furnish the vehicle with the VXM Body Color Accent Package. With the discontinuation of the optional engine cover insert, however, the body-color engine cover insert was no longer available as part of the Body Color Accent Package. As with the preceding trim, for the 2006 model year, the 3SS/1SC Trim Package also unlocked the ability to furnish the vehicle with the VYJ Bright Chrome Package. This 3SS package variant included running boards finished in the paint code identical to the exterior of the ordered SSR. With the discontinuation of the optional engine cover insert, a Bright Chrome engine cover insert was never produced by GM for public distribution. The 3SS/1SC Bright Chrome Package also introduces the inclusion of the Bright Chrome auxiliary instrumentation gauge pod, identically plated with genuine chrome and polished to a mirror reflective finish, an option that was unobtainable by any other means.

=== LS Model/LT Décor ===
During production of the SSR, Chevrolet offered Super Sport (SS) performance packages on several of its cars, including the Cobalt, Impala, Malibu, Malibu Maxx and Monte Carlo. However, despite its name, the Super Sport Roadster never received an SS version beyond concept work. Regardless of option packages, every SSR carried the LS Model designation in the US market and the equivalent LT Décor designation in Canada, as shown on each vehicle's Monroney label; no higher model designation was offered.

Every saleable VIN SSR released for public sale retained identically patterned Speedline cast-aluminum wheels of a five-spoke pattern, mounted to the vehicle using six wheel studs with lug nuts. The wheels were sized at 19 by 8 inches (48 cm × 20 cm) for the front wheels, and 20 by 10 inches (51 cm × 25 cm) for the rear wheels. Every saleable VIN SSR sold to the public also came with Goodyear Eagle RS-A ("Rally Sport Asymmetric") tires sized at P255/45R-19 for the front wheels, and P295/40R-20 for the rear wheels. For the 2003 model year, and for early-production 2004 model year saleable VIN vehicles, every saleable VIN SSR was produced with a Sterling Silver wheel finish. For the 2004 model year, the Sterling Silver wheel finish was replaced by the Ultra Silver wheel finish, which proceeded to be the standard equipment wheel finish for every SSR, during all remaining production years. For the 2004 model year, Chevrolet also introduced the option of wheels plated with genuine chrome, polished to a mirror reflective finish. This option continued availability during all remaining production years.

== Powertrain ==
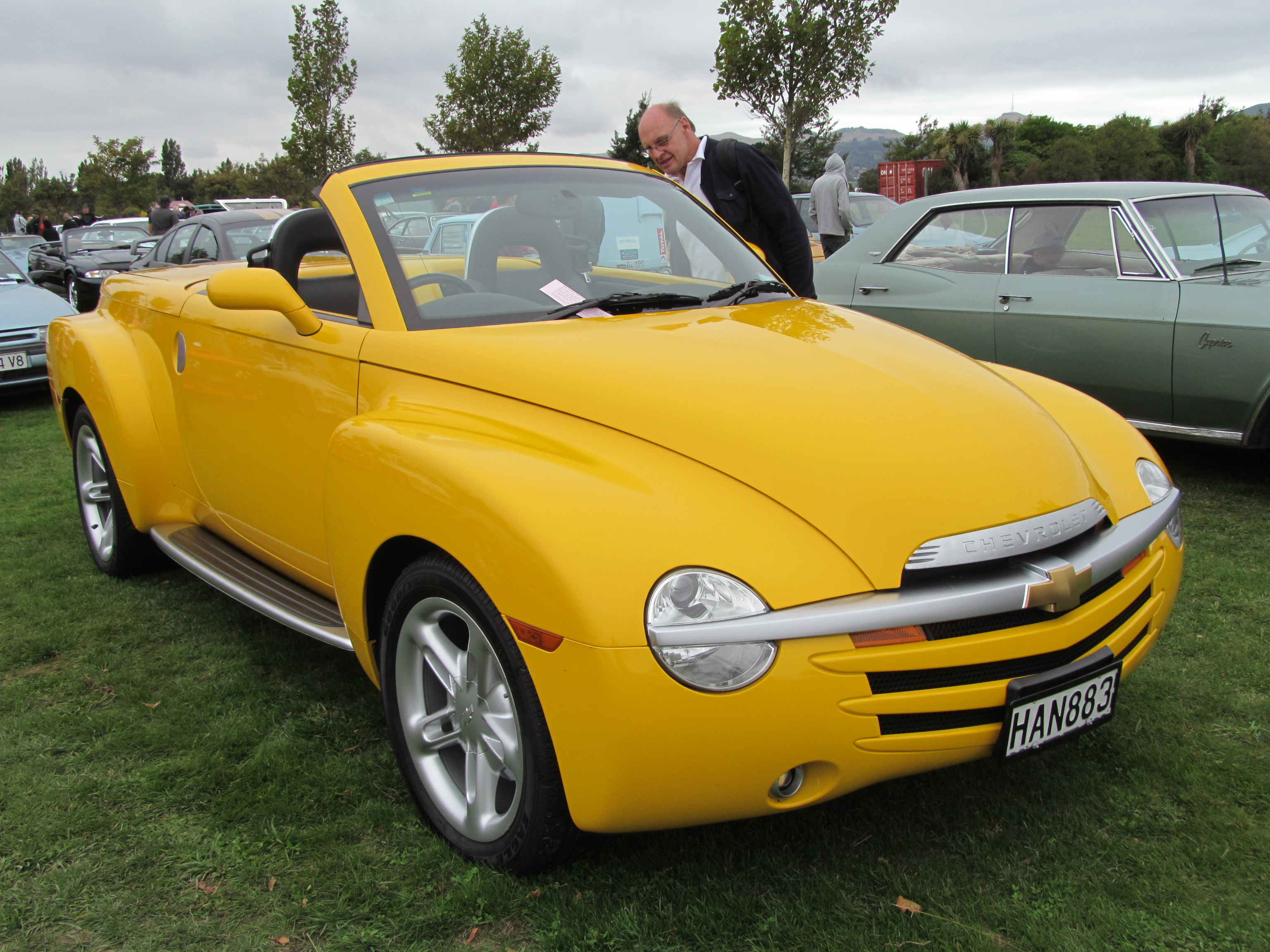
SSR with the top down

For the 2003 and 2004 model years, the SSR used the Generation III LS-based small-block 5.3L LM4 Vortec 5300 V8 engine, producing 300 hp (224 kW; 304 PS) and 331 lb⋅ft (449 N⋅m) of torque. In testing by MotorWeek, it accelerated from 0–60 mph (0–97 km/h) in 7.9 seconds and covered the 1/4 mile (402.3 m) in 16.0 seconds at 87 mph (140 km/h).

In the 2005 model year, GM selected the Generation IV LS-series small-block 6.0L LS2 V8 as the successor to the 5.3L Vortec in the SSR, as the all-new Generation IV LS platform was introduced for 2005. The LS2 was rated at 390 hp (291 kW; 395 PS) and 405 lb⋅ft (549 N⋅m), and a six-speed Tremec T-56 manual transmission became available alongside the four-speed automatic. Chevrolet claimed 0–60 mph (97 km/h) times of 5.3 seconds with the manual and 5.5 seconds with the automatic. For 2006, output rose to 395 hp (295 kW; 400 PS) with the automatic and 400 hp (298 kW; 406 PS) with the manual.

== Sales ==
The SSR was introduced as a 2003 model on New Year's Eve 2002 (December 31). In spite of marketing efforts which included the SSR being used as the pace car for the 2003 Indianapolis 500, the SSR sold below expectations. It launched at a base price of US$41,995, and while GM had expected to build 15,000 a year, it sold 1,664 in 2003, 9,648 in 2004 and 8,107 in 2005. Citing a 301-day supply of SSR availability, General Motors in December 2003 announced five weeks of layoffs at Lansing Craft Center, the factory that made the SSR. In November 2005, as part of a plan to close or cut production at several plants, GM announced that the Craft Center, where about 400 workers built the SSR, would close in mid-2006, ending SSR production. The final SSR, a unique black-on-silver model, was built on March 17, 2006. According to Chevrolet, 24,180 SSR vehicles were produced in total. Inherent to this total production, not every SSR would receive saleable VINs, and of the SSR production that did receive saleable VINs, not all were released as available for public sale. Of the total SSR production, 24,145 vehicles received VINs designated as saleable.

=== Production information ===
The Chevrolet SSR was sold in the US and Canadian markets, with the Canadian models receiving the regular production option Z49 trim designation.

Within the VIN of any regular production SSR, the location of assembly can be distinguished, along with the production designation, the sequential value of the individual SSR, and the model year. Every SSR is endowed by a production sequence, with the VIN character "B" used to define the vehicle as a product of the Lansing Craft Center, and every regular production SSR maintains the subsequent character designation of "1" used to define the SSR as a regular production vehicle. The model year of any Chevrolet SSR is able to be distinguished by the number preceding the production sequence in the VIN. Within every regular production VIN, either the "3B1" indicates model year 2003, the "4B1" indicates model year 2004, the "5B1" indicates model year 2005, or the "6B1" indicates model year 2006.

A set of 27 WB9 pre-production model year 2003 saleable VINs were produced. These WB9 vehicles are identified with the characters 3B0 within the production sequence of the VIN. The first 25 of the WB9 SSR vehicles were collectively given the name Signature Series. Coinciding and immediately subsequent to the assembly of the Signature Series vehicles, a set of 69 WD1 Pilot saleable VIN vehicles were produced. These WD1 Pilot vehicles are qualified under the model year 2003 US and Canadian regular production volume. The 2003 WD1 Pilot vehicles retain sequential VINs. As documented by GM on the build sheets of these vehicles, assembly completion for the regular production WD1 3B1 SSR commenced on June 12, 2003.

A total of 35 Pre-Production non-saleable EX VIN SSR vehicles were produced between calendar years 2003 and 2005, including the 2003 Indianapolis 500 Official Pace Vehicle. These vehicles were generally used as test mules, and almost every one was destroyed before production began for the next model year.

The model year 2006 SSR experienced an assembly pause during December of the 2005 calendar year. Upon resuming assembly in the 2006 calendar year, the 826 remaining model year 2006 regular production SSR VINs were bestowed the regular production option R6K Final Production Run designation. These R6K vehicles are qualified under the model year 2006 US and Canadian regular production volume. The 2006 R6K vehicles retain sequential VINs. As documented by GM on the build sheets of these vehicles, assembly completion for regular production R6K 6B1 SSRs ceased on March 17, 2006.

A total of 24,118 saleable regular production VINs were produced over 35 non-consecutive months during the four-model-year production, with the lowest sequential VIN retaining 3B100001, and the highest sequential VIN reaching 6B124112.

Model Year	Total US Volume	Total CA Volume	EX VIN Volume	Total Volume
2003 WB9	27	0	0	27
2003	3196	161	32	3389
2004	10313	361	2	10676
2005	7195	83	1	7279
2006	1955	28	0	1983
2006 R6K	763	63	0	826
Total	23449	696	35	24180

== Motorsports ==
A specially prepared SSR was the pace car for the 2003 Indianapolis 500 on May 25, 2003.

== See also ==
- Chevrolet SS (concept car)
- Chevrolet HHR
