= Lansing Metal Center =

- Operated: 1952–2006
- Location: Lansing Township, Michigan
- Coordinates: 42.7375°N 84.5829°W
- Industry: Automotive
- Employees: 1,200
- Volume: 1,200,000 sq ft (110,000 m^{2})
- Owner: General Motors
- Defunct: 2006; 20 years ago

The Lansing Metal Center was a General Motors foundry located in Lansing Township, Michigan, directly across Saginaw Street from the Lansing Craft Center. It was originally built as a jet engine manufacturing plant in 1952 and shuttered in 2006.

Upon its closing, the plant was 1,590,000 square feet (148,000 m^{2}) in size, and employed 1,200. General Motors began the demolition of the plant in February 2008 along with the Lansing Craft Center, when all operations were transferred to the nearby Lansing Delta Township facility.
