= Lansing Craft Centre =

Former General Motors factory

- Operated: 1919–2006
- Location: 2801 West Saginaw St; Lansing Township, Michigan
- Coordinates: 42.7427°N 84.5851°W
- Industry: Automotive
- Products: Automobiles
- Employees: 400
- Volume: 985,000 sq ft (91,500 m^{2})
- Owner: General Motors
- Defunct: March 2006; 20 years ago

The Lansing Craft Centre (LCC) was a specialized General Motors automobile assembly factory in Lansing Township, Michigan, located at 2801 West Saginaw Street across from GM's Lansing Metal Center.

== History ==
The facility was originally built by GM as the "Oldsmobile Differential Plant and Foundry" in 1919. The foundry was repurposed as the "Reatta Craft Centre" in 1984 when GM chose it as the manufacturing site of the Buick Reatta, which began production in 1988 after a stamping plant, body shop, and assembly area were constructed. After the end of production of the Reatta, the plant was renamed the "Lansing Craft Centre". Over its existence, the Lansing Craft Centre manufactured GM's low-volume vehicles including the EV1, Cadillac Eldorado, convertible Chevrolet Cavalier and Pontiac Sunfire and Chevrolet SSR.

=== Closure ===
In November 2005, General Motors announced that it would close the Lansing Craft Centre in mid-2006, and the final SSR, a unique black-on-silver model, was assembled on March 17, 2006. The plant was demolished from 2008 to 2009.

At the time of its closure, the plant size was 985,000 square feet (91,500 m^{2}) and the facility employed 400, many of whom were transferred to the new Lansing Grand River Assembly, as well as some operations transferred to the nearby Lansing Delta Township Assembly.

The facility was demolished in 2008 along with the Lansing Metal Center.

== Vehicles produced ==
- 1988–1991 Buick Reatta
- 1995–2000 Chevrolet Cavalier convertible
- 1995–2000 Pontiac Sunfire convertible
- 1997–1999 General Motors EV1
- 2000–2002 Cadillac Eldorado (Note: formerly assembled at the Detroit/Hamtramck Assembly.)
- 2003–2006 Chevrolet SSR
