= K platform =

The K platform may refer to:

- Chrysler K platform, basis for the 1980s "K cars" and others
- Toyota K platform, basis for the Camry, minivans, SUVs and luxury sedans
- GM K platform (1980), FWD
- GM K platform (1975), RWD
