= C-Body =

C-Body may refer to:

- Chrysler C platform, rear wheel drive full-size cars
- GM C platform (1925), full-size rear-wheel-drive upscale and luxury cars
- General Motors C platform (1985), full-size front-wheel-drive upscale and luxury cars
