= General Motors H platform (FWD) =

GM H platform (FWD)
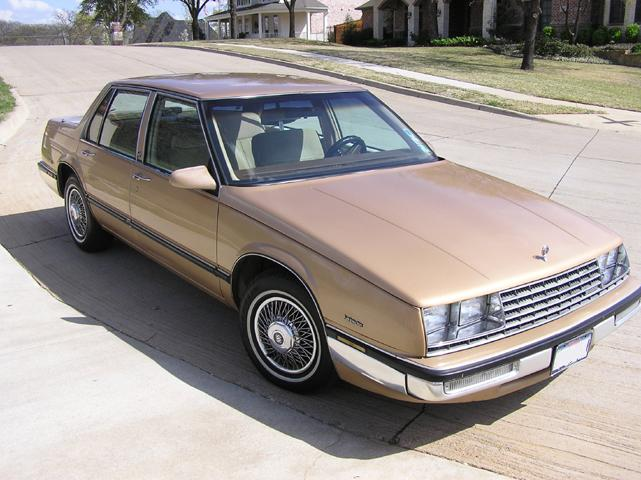
- 1986 Buick LeSabre

Overview
- Manufacturer: General Motors
- Also called: H-body
- Production: 1986–1999

Body and chassis
- Class: Large car platform
- Body styles: 2-door coupe 4-door sedan
- Vehicles: Buick LeSabre; Oldsmobile Eighty-Eight; Pontiac Bonneville
- Related: GM C platform GM G platform (FWD); GM K platform (FWD)

Powertrain
- Engines: Gasoline: Buick V6
- Transmission: 4-speed THM440T4/4T60-E/4T65-E automatic

Dimensions
- Wheelbase: 110.8 in (2,814 mm)

Chronology
- Predecessor: GM B platform GM G platform (RWD)
- Successor: GM G platform

The H platform, or H-body designates a General Motors front-wheel-drive full-sized car platform introduced in 1986, and in most respects identical to the front-drive C platform introduced for model year 1985. Originally available in both 2-door and 4-door versions — the latter was more popular and two-door models dropped by 1992. Engines were predominantly the Buick's 3.8 liter (231 cubic-inch) V6 engine and later, GM's Buick 3800 V6; in naturally aspirated and supercharged variants (from 1991 to 1999).

Previously, GM had used the H platform nomenclature to designate the unrelated rear-wheel-drive compact cars. Starting in 2000, all H-body vehicles moved to the G platform, related also to the K platform. GM continued to call it the H platform.

== 1986–1999 Buick LeSabre ==
The 1986 LeSabre was introduced on the new front wheel drive H platform, foregoing its previous rear-drive B platform. Platform-mates were the Oldsmobile Delta 88 and, debuting one model year later, the Pontiac Bonneville. The LeSabre used a reverse clamshell hood hinged at the front like the Buick Electra, introduced the year before. The all new flush aerodynamic styling combined with front drive ushered in a new era for the LeSabre.

In 1986 model, the LeSabre featured the 3.0 liter (181 cubic-inch) V6 as standard, with most models from 1986 until 2005 using Buick's 3.8 liter (231 cubic-inch) V6 engine, developing 150 hp (112 kW). Beginning in 1988 the engine was redeveloped to include a balance shaft, with 165 hp (123 kW). For 1991 this engine, called the 3800 V6, made 170 hp (127 kW) with the addition of Tuned Port Injection.

This LeSabre was re-introduced in 1991 for the 1992 model year, and was redesigned along the same lines as the previous year's Park Avenue. The LeSabre was available as a four-door sedan from this point forward until the car was discontinued in 2005. The headlights were streamlined with a separated amber turn signal strip wrapping around the lower front fascia. The rear fascia featured a wider trunk mouth and lower lift over height to ease loading baggage while the front was smoothed with simplified chrome molding and absent bumperettes. The LeSabre also featured GM's plastic body technologies, with high-stress plastic replacing traditional steel in the front fenders. The LeSabre's engine from 1992 to 1995 was the 3800 V6 (L27), which produced 170 hp (127 kW) and 225 lb·ft (305 N·m) The 3513 lb (1593 kg) car got 18 mpg (13.1 L/100 km) in the city and 28 mpg (8.4 L/100 km) on the highway, which was slightly better than the 1991 model. The car accelerated to 60 mph (97 km/h) in 8.9 seconds and could cover the quarter mile in 16.9 seconds at 80 mph (129 km/h). Top speed was electronically limited to 108 mph (173 km/h).

== 1986–1999 Oldsmobile 88 ==
For 1986, the Oldsmobile Delta 88 switched platforms from the GM B platform to the smaller front-wheel drive H platform, with a wheelbase of only 110.8 inches (2,814 mm). The headlights changed from square sealed beam quads to integrated regular/high beam composite lamps in 1987. The Oldsmobile Eighty Eight was redesigned for 1992, following the redesign of the Ninety Eight the previous year. This was the last Eighty Eight or 88 model from Oldsmobile (along with its performance LSS and Regency models) before being discontinued in 1999 and being replaced in 2001 with the Aurora. The 3.8 L Buick V6 was still the only engine, but output increased to 170 hp (127 kW) and 220 lb⋅ft (300 N⋅m) of torque.

== 1987–1999 Pontiac Bonneville ==
For 1987, Pontiac decided to change the Bonneville from the rear wheel drive G-body with the V8 to the more economical front wheel drive one-year-old H Body platform with the Buick LeSabre and Oldsmobile 88. Unlike its platform-mates (and like its 1982-'86 predecessor), a coupe body style was never offered. Initially, a 150 hp (110 kW) 3.8 L V6 was the sole engine, mated to a four-speed Hydramatic 4T60 automatic and performance was adequate from this pairing. The new Bonneville was placed on Car & Driver's “10 Best” list for 1987, offering both a base model and LE model. For LE models, an SSE sport package was also available that featured a quicker gear ratio, sportier suspension and more standard features, as the Bonneville was intended to have a more sporty, European flavor than the LeSabre and 88.

The ninth-generation Pontiac Bonneville was unveiled on February 8, 1991, at the 1991 Chicago International Auto Show and launched in July 1991 for the 1992 model year; the interior and exterior of the car were completely redesigned. Developed over a 4 1/2-year period from 1986 to early 1991 under program director Dave Mitchell, styling work took place from 1987 to 1988, with a final design by John Folden being chosen in 1988 and frozen for production that same year. The first prototypes were built in 1989 and went into testing in mid-1989. In August 1990, production preparation began, with early production "builds" being constructed during late 1990. The first series production models were assembled in May 1991, with SE variants being launched in July 1991. This generation hosted quite a few Bonneville firsts, becoming quicker and considerably safer. One of the most notable improvements over the previous generation was that the Bonneville SE now came standard with a driver airbag and was the first General Motors product equipped with a passenger airbag, while ABS was available as part of the sport appearance package. The SSE models came with standard ABS and traction control.

== Vehicles ==
Years	Model	Previous platform	Next platform
1986–1999	Buick LeSabre	GM B platform	GM G platform
1986–1999	Oldsmobile 88/LSS	GM B platform	Retired
1987–1999	Pontiac Bonneville	GM G platform (RWD)	GM G platform (FWD)

== See also ==
- List of General Motors platforms
- General Motors H platform
