= Buick Lucerne =

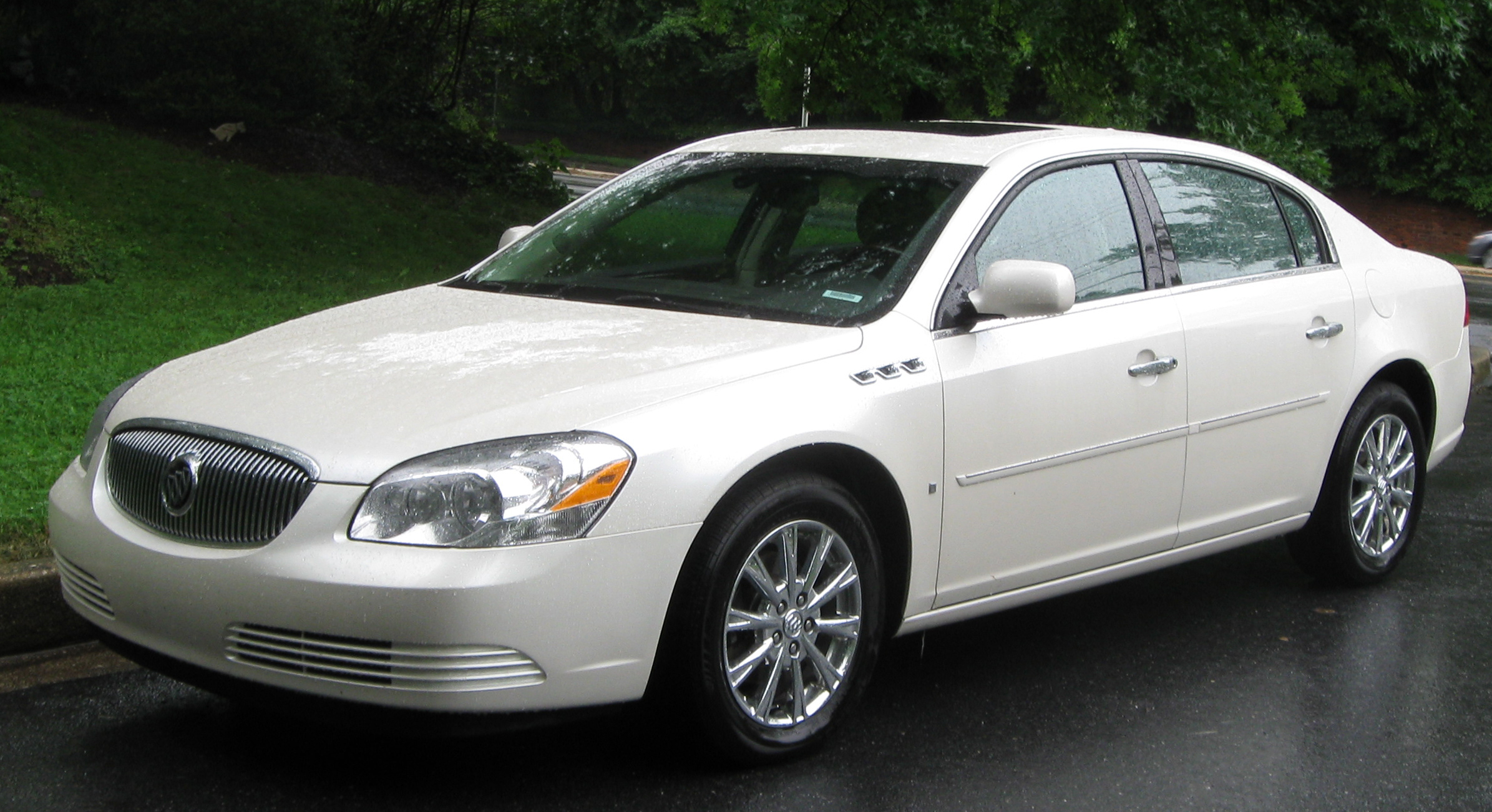

Overview
- Manufacturer: Buick (General Motors)
- Production: 2005–June 15, 2011
- Model years: 2006–2011
- Assembly: United States: Hamtramck, Michigan (Detroit/Hamtramck Assembly)
- Designer: Joel Piaskowski; John Manoogian II

Body and chassis
- Class: Full-size car
- Body style: 4-door sedan
- Layout: Transverse FF layout
- Platform: G platform/GMX222
- Related: Cadillac DTS

Powertrain
- Engine: 3.8 L 3800 Series III V6; 3.9 L High Value V6; 4.6 L Northstar V8
- Transmission: 4-speed 4T65-E automatic (V6); 4-speed 4T80-E automatic (V8)

Dimensions
- Wheelbase: 115.6 in (2,936 mm)
- Length: 203.2 in (5,161 mm)
- Width: 73.8 in (1,875 mm)
- Height: 58.0 in (1,473 mm)

Chronology
- Predecessor: Buick LeSabre; Buick Park Avenue
- Successor: Buick LaCrosse

The Buick Lucerne is a full-size car manufactured by General Motors from 2005 to 2011. Named for the city of Lucerne, Switzerland, it served as Buick's top-of-the-line sedan until it was replaced by the second generation Buick LaCrosse.

== History ==
The Lucerne replaced the full-size LeSabre and the Park Avenue in the Buick range, and used a revised G platform, nonetheless referred to by GM as the H platform.

The Lucerne was introduced with the standard 3.8 liter Buick V6 (also known as the GM 3800 engine) or optional 4.6 liter Cadillac Northstar LD8 V8 as well as optional active suspension, marketed as Magnetic Ride Control. For 2005, all General Motors vehicles equipped with the 3.8 L V6 become the first SULEV-compliant vehicles.

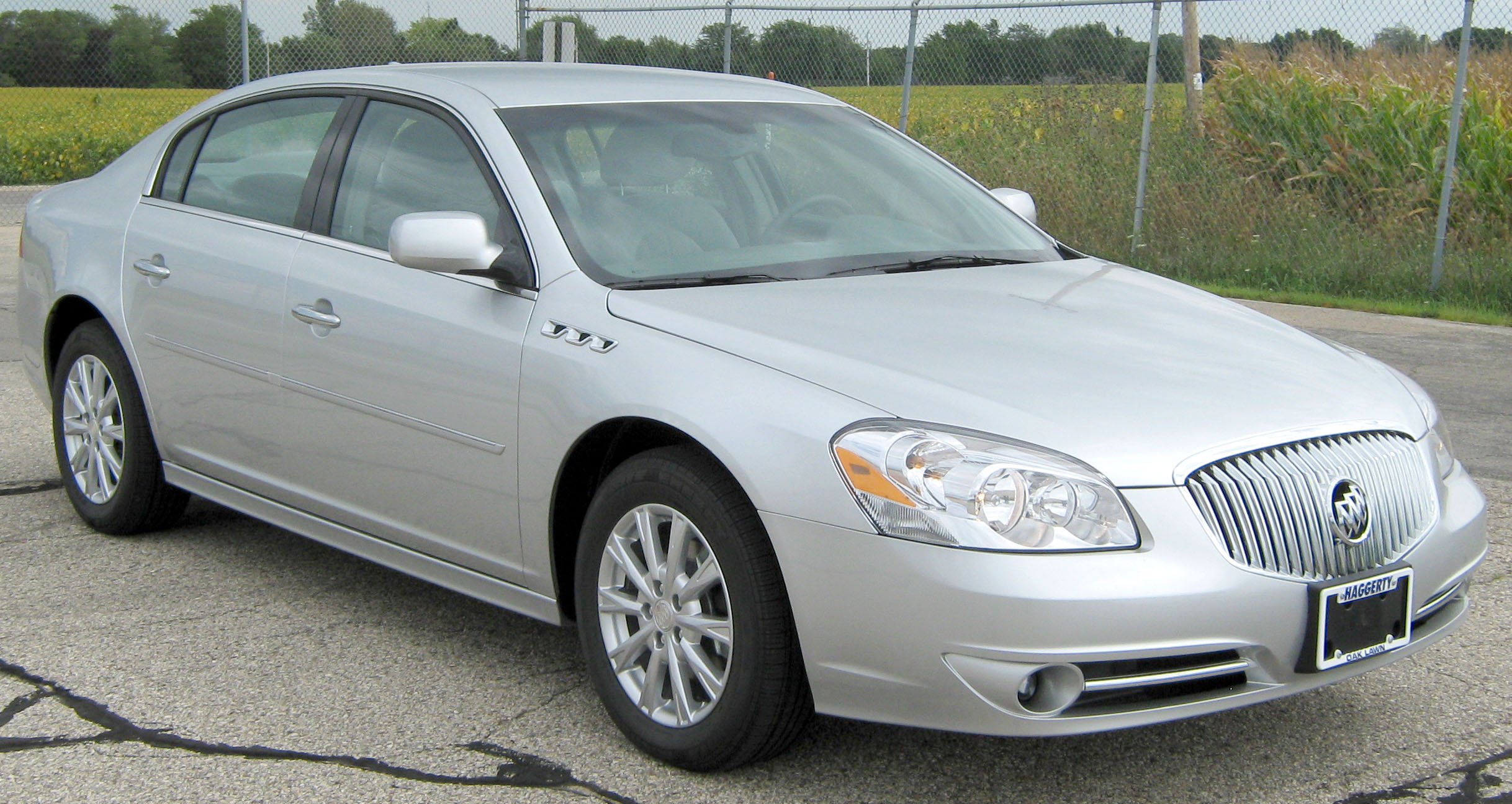
2011 Buick Lucerne CX

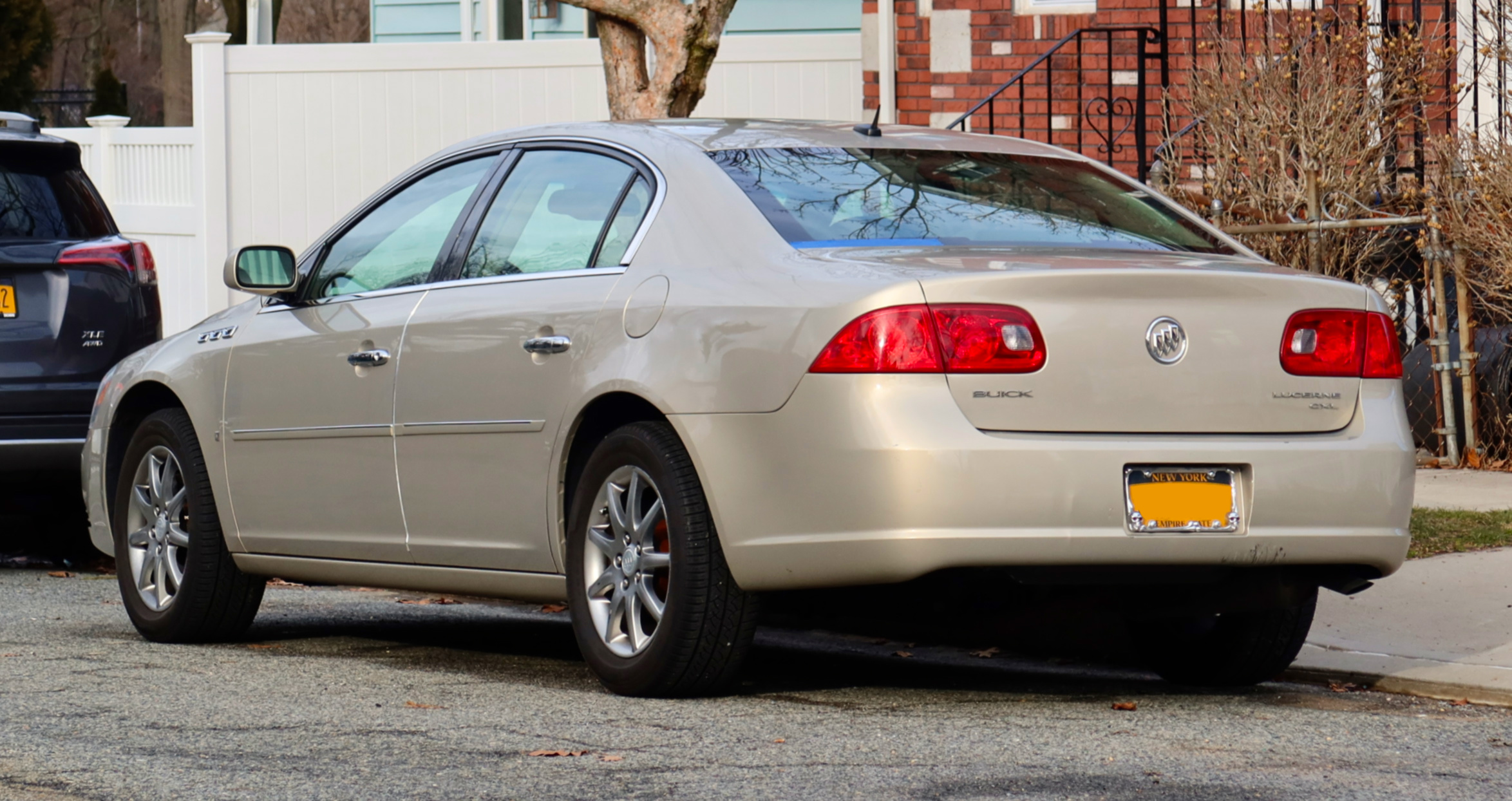
2007 Buick Lucerne rear view

The Lucerne featured a row of "Ventiports," on the front fenders, corresponding to the number of cylinders in each bank of its V-engine — three on each side for the V6 or four for the V8. The CXL trim package added numerous premium features.

The Lucerne was manufactured at GM's Detroit/Hamtramck Assembly Plant alongside the Cadillac DTS. The plant won Initial Quality Awards from J.D. Power and Associates from 2004 through 2006. GM also led all other automakers in Strategic Vision's Total Quality Index (TQI)

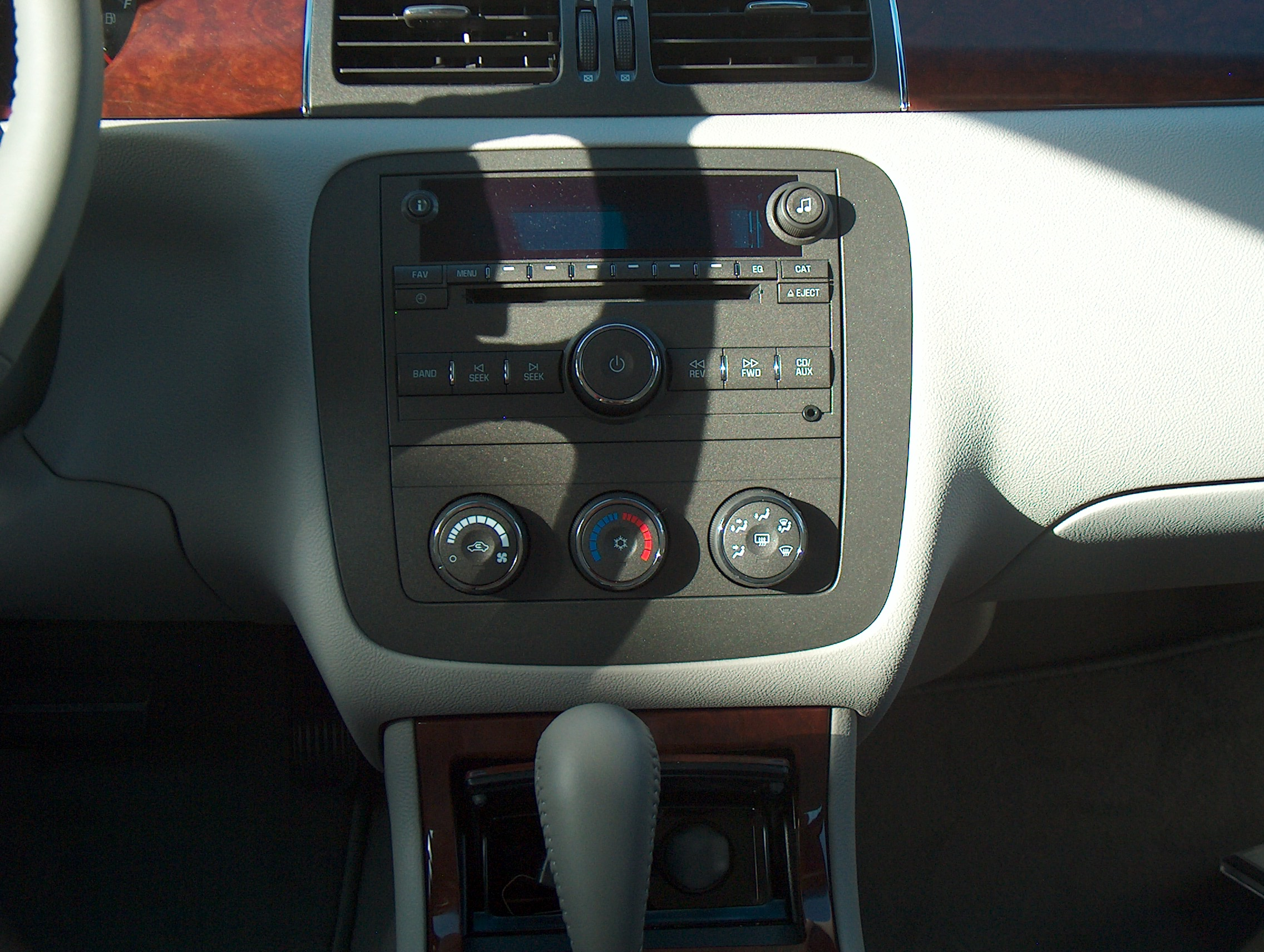
2008 Buick Lucerne controls closeup

The Super trim level was introduced at the 2007 New York Auto Show, featuring the 4.6 liter Northstar L37 V8; revised trim; an increase of 17 hp (13 kW) horsepower, and revised front styling and a rear spoiler.

All Lucernes received modest mid-cycle updates in 2008, adding optional blind spot monitoring and lane departure warning system and revised exterior colors. Two new trim levels, CXL Special Edition (with more standard features than regular CXL) and Super, were added for 2008. The 2009 Lucerne received small upgades, including a new base engine, the 3.9 L GM High Value LZ9 V6, Bluetooth phone connectivity, and XM NavTraffic. Flex-fuel technology was made available at no additional cost.

For 2010, the Super's rocker panels, grille, and fog lights were added as standard equipment.

The 2011 Lucerne was largely unchanged. The last was built on June 15, 2011. The second generation LaCrosse replaced it as Buick's flagship sedan for 2012.

== Engines ==
Years	Engine	Displacement	Power	Torque
2006–2008	3.8 L 3800 L26 V6	231 cu in (3791 cc)	197 hp (147 kW) @ 5200 rpm	227 lb⋅ft (308 N⋅m) @ 3800 rpm
2009–2011	3.9 L GM 3900 V6	237 cu in (3880 cc)	227 hp (169 kW) @ 5700 rpm	237 lb⋅ft (321 N⋅m) @ 3200 rpm
2006–2008	4.6 L Northstar LD8 V8	279 cu in (4565 cc)	275 hp (205 kW) @ 6000 rpm	295 lb⋅ft (400 N⋅m) @ 4400 rpm
2008–2011	4.6 L Northstar L37 V8	279 cu in (4565 cc)	292 hp (218 kW) @ 6300 rpm	288 lb⋅ft (390 N⋅m) @ 4500 rpm

== Safety ==
The Buick Lucerne earns a "Good" overall score in the Insurance Institute for Highway Safety (IIHS) front impact test, and an "Acceptable" score in the side impact test. The IIHS also found that 2006-08 model year Lucerne had the highest fatality rate in the large 4-door car class.

== Yearly American sales ==
Calendar Year	Total American sales
2005	8,821
2006	96,515
2007	82,923
2008	54,930
2009	31,292
2010	26,459
2011	20,358
2012	971
