= General Motors K platform =

The General Motors K platform (commonly called the K-body) was the basis of the Cadillac Seville model over two entirely different automobile platforms.

- 1975–1979 General Motors K platform (RWD)
- 1980–1999 General Motors K platform (FWD)
