= General Motors G platform (FWD) =

GM G platform (FWD)
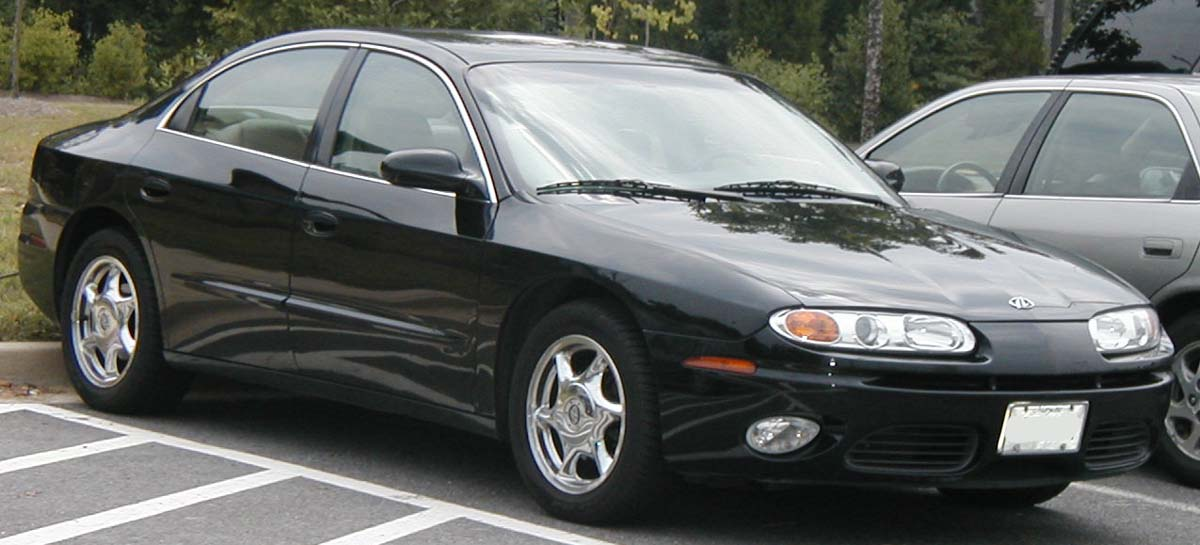
- 2001-2003 Oldsmobile Aurora

Overview
- Manufacturer: General Motors
- Also called: GMX690
- Production: 1995–2011

Body and chassis
- Class: Full-size
- Body style(s): 4-door sedan 2-door coupe
- Related: GM C platform (FWD); GM H platform (FWD); GM K platform (FWD)

Chronology
- Predecessor: GM C platform GM E platform GM H platform GM K platform
- Successor: GM Sigma platform (STS/SLS); GM W 3rd gen platform (LeSabre); GM Epsilon II LWB platform (Seville); GM Zeta platform (Park Avenue); GM Omega platform

The General Motors G platform (also called G-Body) automobile platform designation was used for front-wheel drive full-sized and luxury cars between 1995 and 2011.

Previously, General Motors used the G-body designation for unrelated mid-sized cars.

The G-body was based on Cadillac's K-body architecture. The platform was introduced in 1995 with Buick Riviera 2-door coupe (which moved up from the GM E platform) and the Oldsmobile Aurora 4-door sedan (a new model that replaced the Riviera-derived Toronado). By the turn of the millennium, full-sized cars from four different GM makes were using some derivative of the platform.

== Platform consolidation ==
Starting with the 1997 Buick Park Avenue, GM consolidated its four large-car platforms; C platform, K platform, H platform, and G platform; all to the G platform. However, GM decided to retain their previous platform designations. These legacy platform designations were used in the VIN number and official GM publications. Models designated as "G" went out of production for MY (Model Year) 1999, but successor models were sold until MY 2011.

The G-body was noted for having one of the strongest unibody car frames in production (25 Hz). GM literature noted the need to use a 'frame crusher,' designed to test heavy-duty truck frames, to finally break the G-body structure in their crush-to-failure procedures.

The G platform vehicles were also noted for having belt-in-seat style seat belts like the mid-size GMT360 SUVs. The G-body also featured four-wheel independent suspension with a MacPherson strut style front suspension and a semi-trailing arm style rear suspension that utilized aluminum control arms. All-new aluminum control arms were introduced for the front suspension for 1998. The handling was further enhanced with standard front and rear stabilizer bars and lateral links in the rear suspension to further control wheel toe.

=== Vehicles 1995-2005 ===
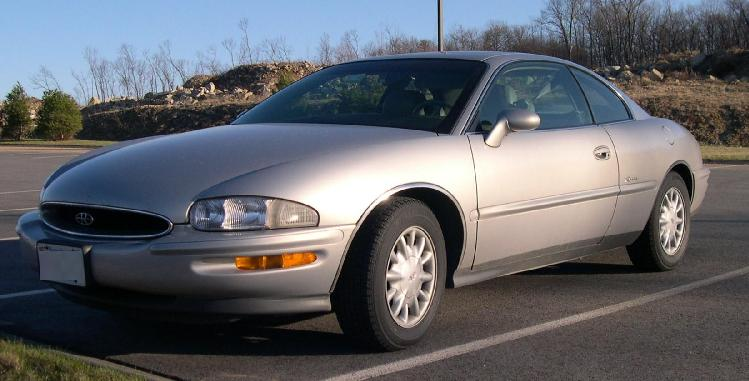
1999 Buick Riviera

Years	Wheelbase	Model	Platform Name*
1995–1999	113.8 in	Buick Riviera	GM G platform
1995–1999	113.8 in	Oldsmobile Aurora	GM G platform
1997–2005	113.8 in	Buick Park Avenue	GM C platform
1998–2004	112.2 in	Cadillac Seville	GM K platform
2000–2005	112.2 in	Buick LeSabre	GM H platform
2000–2005	112.2 in	Pontiac Bonneville	GM H platform
2001–2003	112.2 in	Oldsmobile Aurora	GM G platform
2000–2005	115.3 in	Cadillac DeVille	GM K platform

* Official designation given by GM, despite using a G platform-derivative. This name also corresponds to the 4th letter in the VIN of the vehicle.

== 2006 Revision ==
The G platform was updated for the 2006 model year. The final car using this platform was the Buick Lucerne, which ended production in June 2011.

=== Vehicles ===
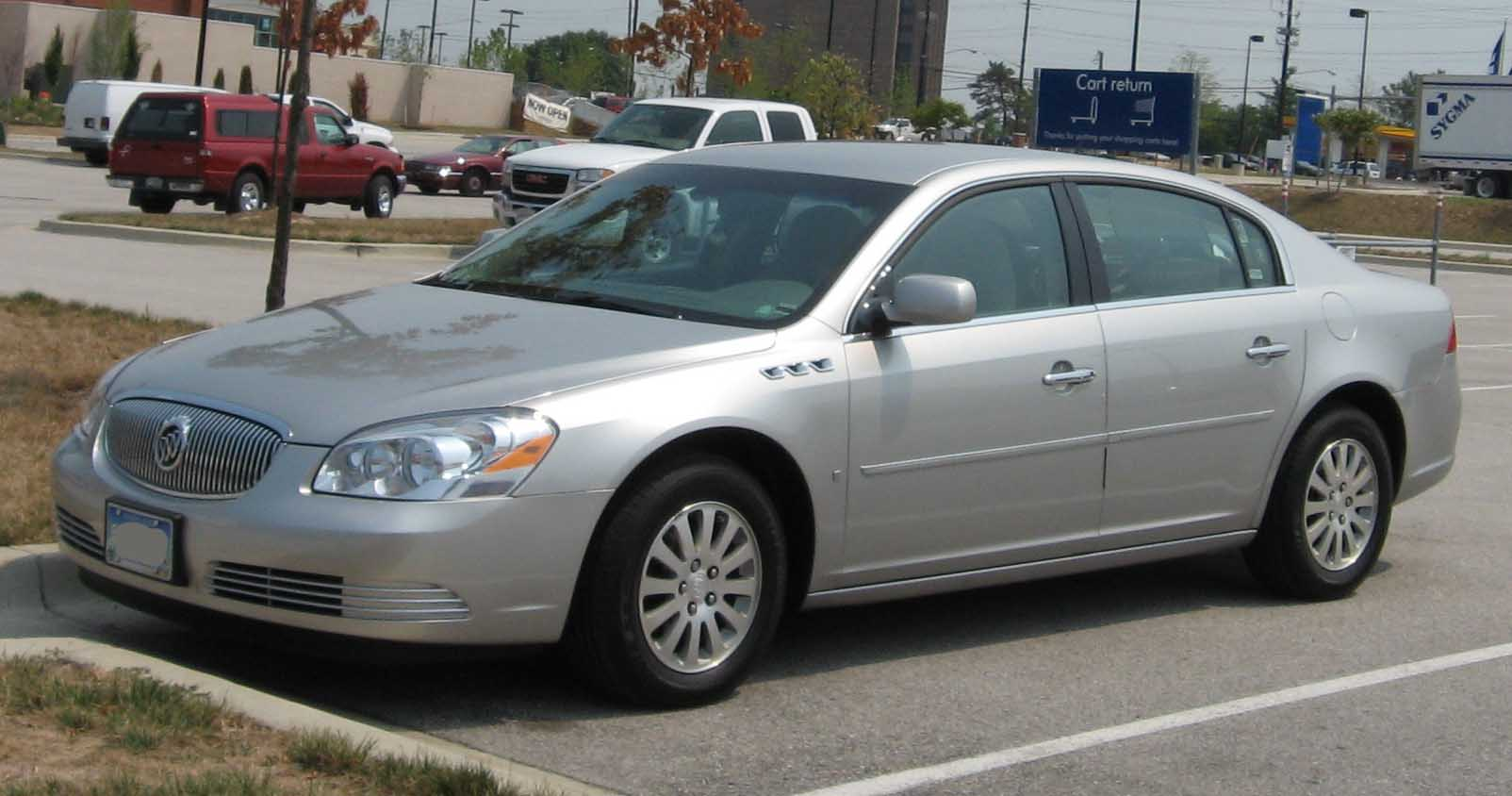
2006 Buick Lucerne

Years	Wheelbase	Model	Platform Name*
2006–2011	115.6 in	Cadillac DTS	GM K platform
2006–2011	115.6 in	Buick Lucerne	GM H platform

* Official designation given by GM, despite using a G platform-derivative. This name also corresponds to the 4th letter in the VIN of the vehicle.

== See also ==
- List of General Motors platforms
- General Motors G Platform
