= General Motors C platform (FWD) =

GM C platform (FWD)
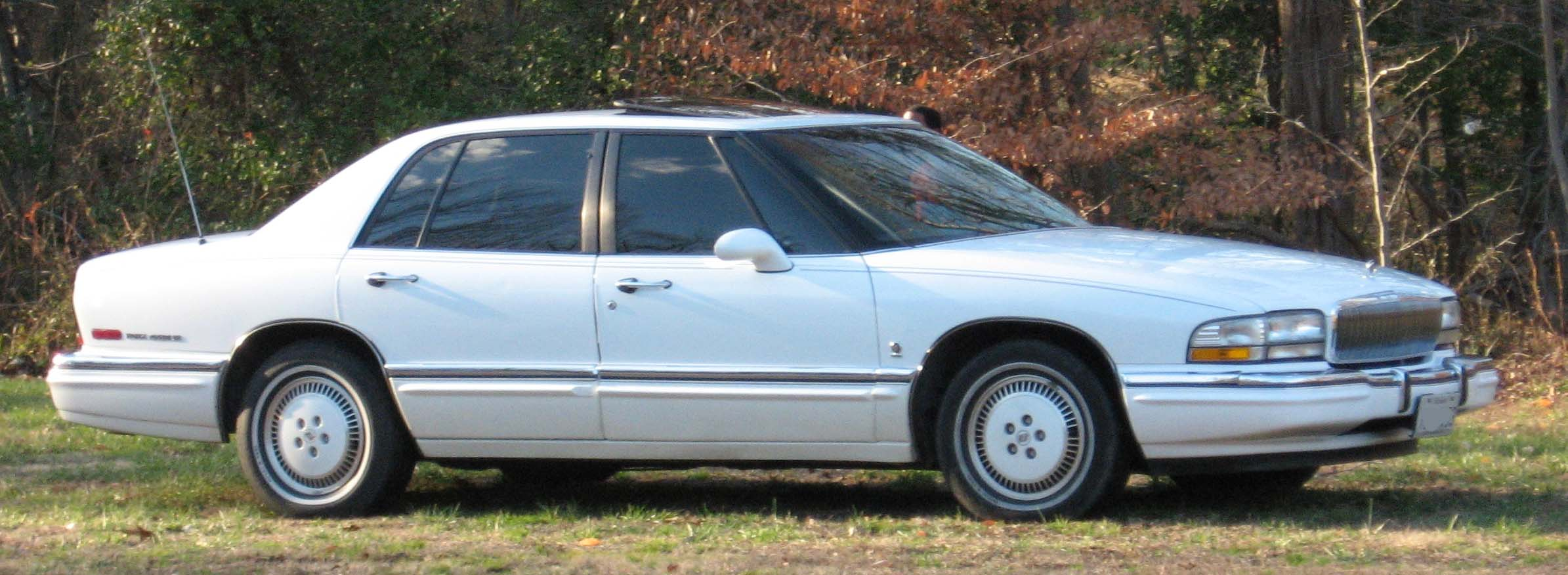
- 1991–1996 Buick Park Avenue

Overview
- Manufacturer: General Motors
- Also called: C-Body
- Production: 1985–1996

Body and chassis
- Class: Full-size car
- Layout: Transverse FF layout
- Body styles: Two- and four-door sedan; extended wheelbase limousine.
- Vehicles: Buick Electra; Buick Park Avenue; Cadillac De Ville; Cadillac Fleetwood; Cadillac Series 75; Cadillac Sixty Special; Oldsmobile 98
- Related: GM H platform (FWD); GM K platform (FWD)

Chronology
- Successor: GM G platform

GM C platform, also known as the C-Body, was a front wheel drive (FWD) automobile platform used by General Motors' Cadillac, Buick and Oldsmobile divisions for their full-sized automobiles from 1985 through 1996, sharing unibody construction, transverse engine configuration, rack and pinion steering and four-wheel independent suspension.

C-Bodies used, V6 or V8 engines, GM's TMH440 transaxle (initially), unibody construction — and all had been aerodynamically improved, with the Oldsmobile achieving a .383 drag coefficient.

GM's C platform and H platform were largely identical, sharing the same 110.8 in wheelbase, most bodywork, interior details, glass and engines. Manufacture began with the C platform in late 1983, first at two purpose-built plants, Wentzville Assembly and Orion Assembly — later moving to Lansing Car Assembly as well as Flint and Willow Run assembly plants.

Significantly shorter, narrower, lighter and more fuel-efficient than the platform they replaced, the C Platform vehicles were noted for having nearly the same key interior dimensions as their predecessors and a much more nearly flat passenger compartment floor — albeit with thinner seats and dramatically less upper tumblehome, locating windshield as well as side glass closer to passengers.

Introduced in early 1984, the models were marketed as the Oldsmobile Ninety-Eight (11th gen), Buick Electra (6th gen) and Cadillac Deville (6th gen) and Fleetwood (1985–90).

Cadillac would later introduce C Body models with a 113.8 in wheelbase. Most C-body vehicles were ultimately replaced with cars on the related G, H, and K platform designations.

The Cadillac Series 75 limousine briefly made its return on this platform, stretched by 23.6" to a wheelbase of 134.4". Cadillac used the platform though 1993; Buick heavily revised the Electra, becoming the first generation Buick Park Avenue (1991–1996), while still using the C Platform; and Oldsmobile marketed C Platform derivatives through 1990, notably the Oldsmobile Touring Sedan.

== Models using the C Platform ==
Years	Model	Next platform
1985–1987	Cadillac Series 75	-
1985–1992	Cadillac Fleetwood	GM D platform
1985–1993	Cadillac De Ville (6th Generation)	GM K platform (FWD)
1987–1993	Cadillac Sixty Special	-
1985–1990	Buick Electra (6th Generation)	-
1991–1996	Buick Park Avenue	GM G platform (FWD)
1985–1996	Oldsmobile 98 (11th generation)	
1987–1990	Oldsmobile Touring Sedan (Subsequent 98 trim levels used a succeeding platform.)	

== Related H body models ==
The H platform and C platform were largely identical, sharing the same 110.8 in wheelbase, most bodywork, interior details, glass and engines.

Years	Model	Previous platform	Next platform
1986–1999	Buick LeSabre	GM B platform	GM G platform
1986–1999	Oldsmobile 88/LSS	GM B platform	Retired
1987–1999	Pontiac Bonneville	GM G platform (RWD)	GM G platform (FWD)

== See also ==
- List of General Motors platforms
