= Buick Park Avenue =

Large sedan car

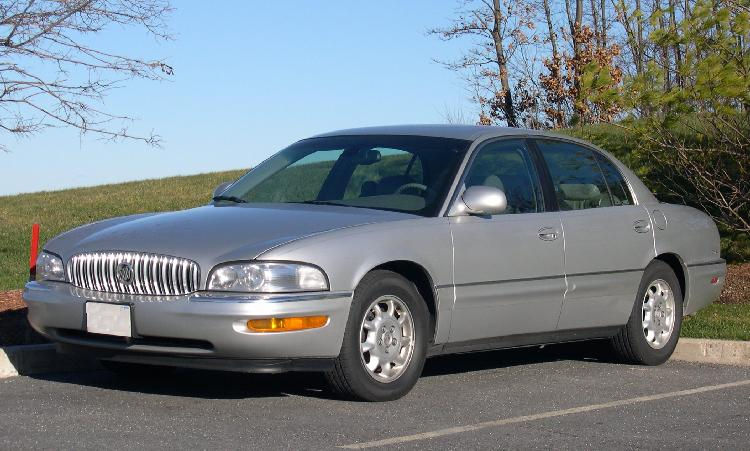

Overview
- Manufacturer: Buick (General Motors 1991-2005); SAIC-GM (2007-2012)
- Production: 1990–2004 (U.S.); 2007–2012 (China)
- Model years: 1991–2005 (U.S.); 2007–2012 (China)

Body and chassis
- Class: Full-size car
- Body style: 4-door sedan
- Layout: Transverse front-engine, front-wheel drive (1991–2005); FR layout (2007–2012)

Chronology
- Predecessor: Buick Electra; Buick Royaum (China)
- Successor: Buick Lucerne

The Buick Park Avenue is a full-size car built by Buick. The nameplate was first used in 1975 for an appearance option package on the Electra 225 Limited. It became an Electra trim level in 1978 and its own model starting in the 1991 model year after the Electra was discontinued.

There were two generations of the Park Avenue that were manufactured in the United States until 2005. In 2007, the nameplate was revived on a large Buick sedan built by Shanghai GM for the Chinese market based on the Holden Caprice from the WM/WN range. The nameplate is derived from Park Avenue, a boulevard in an affluent area of New York City.

== Electra Park Avenue (1975–1990) ==
1975–1976

Park Avenue first appeared as an appearance package on the 1975 Buick Electra Limited. It included similar seats to the Cadillac Sixty Special, a Buick 455 cu. in. V8, posi-traction, 15-inch rallye sport wheels, rear automatic leveling, a remote mirror with thermometer, and automatic climate control. Optional features included a full center console, leather upholstery, and an Air Cushion Restraint System. The 1976 cars were largely the same except for some styling revisions and added emissions systems.

1977–1984

The Park Avenue became an official trim level on the Electra in 1978. Cosmetically, a different grille and redesigned tail lights were the only notable changes. 1979 brought a redesigned, flat front end and a subtly different taillight treatment featuring a Buick crest and bisecting horizontal silver line. A more extensive redesign occurred for the 1980 model year.

1985–1990

For 1985, the Park Avenue was redesigned along with the rest of the Electra line as it moved away from GM's RWD C-Body platform to the new FWD C-Body platform. It remained the top trim level available and came standard with a Buick 3800 V6. For 1985 only, a diesel engine was available; it sold poorly and was discontinued for 1986. The coupe version remained available initially but slow sales led to its discontinuation in 1987.

For 1989, Buick introduced the Park Avenue Ultra trim level. The Ultra was an upgrade to the Electra Park Avenue trim and featured a standard leather interior with dual 20-way power front seats designed and manufactured by Lear Siegler and styled by Giorgetto Giugiaro of Italdesign; lower-body accent exterior paint treatment; a thick-padded, french-seamed vinyl top with limousine-style rear-window surround (available only on Ultra); simulated burled elm trim on the doors and instrument panel; unique aluminum wheels; anti-lock brakes; chromed B-pillar moldings; specific grille and tail lamps; leather-wrapped steering wheel; electronic instrumentation; a padded glove-compartment door; and unique interior door panel trim. The Park Avenue Ultra carried a higher base price than Cadillac's Sedan de Ville. The Park Avenue Ultra did not gain much popular recognition, however, until the following generation of Park Avenue where the "Ultra" badge offered even more features.

== Essence concept car ==
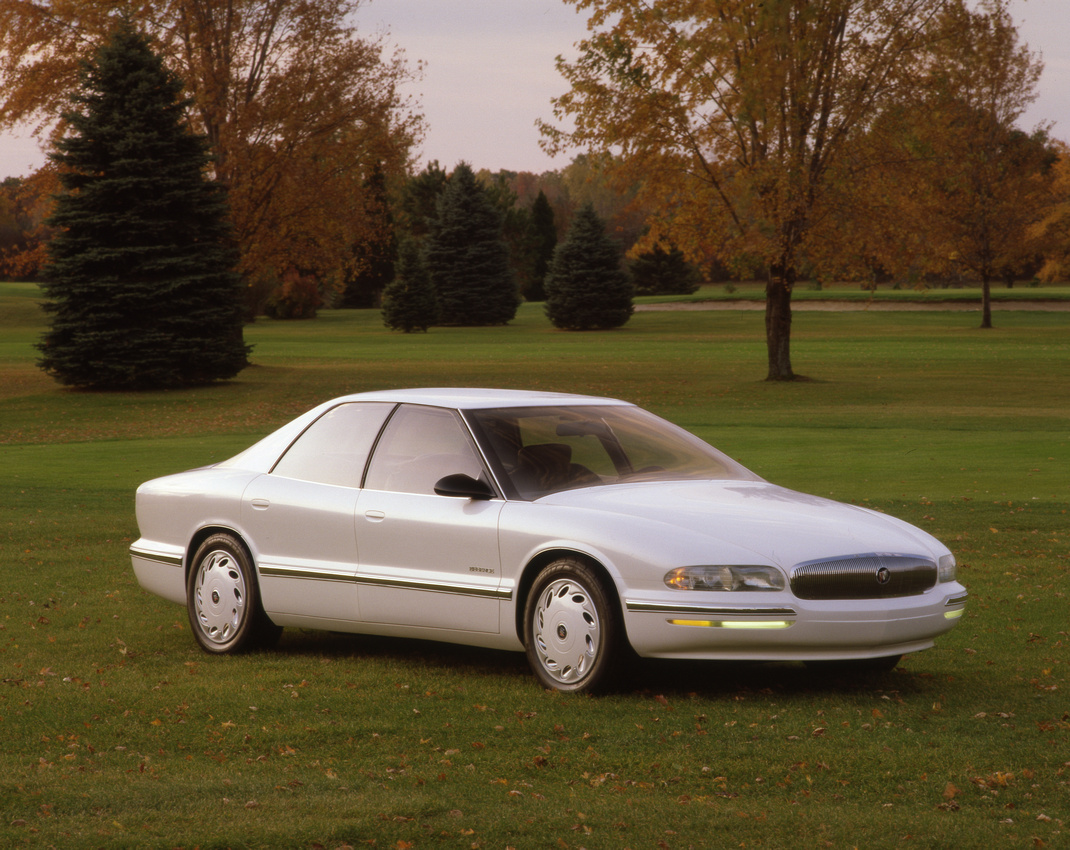
1989 Buick Park Avenue Essence

The Buick Park Avenue Essence was a concept car designed and engineered by the Buick division of General Motors to showcase advanced technology and styling. First shown in 1989 in a metallic light green color, the Essence made rounds through the auto show circuits later in a metallic white. Inside the Essence was a wide, sweeping instrument panel that housed a prototype Delco Navicar navigation system among other innovations. Smooth, graceful body lines forecast the eventual production Park Avenue, introduced in 1990. The Essence was powered by the then-new 165 hp version of Buick's 3800 OHV V6 engine.

== First generation (1991–1996) ==
First generation
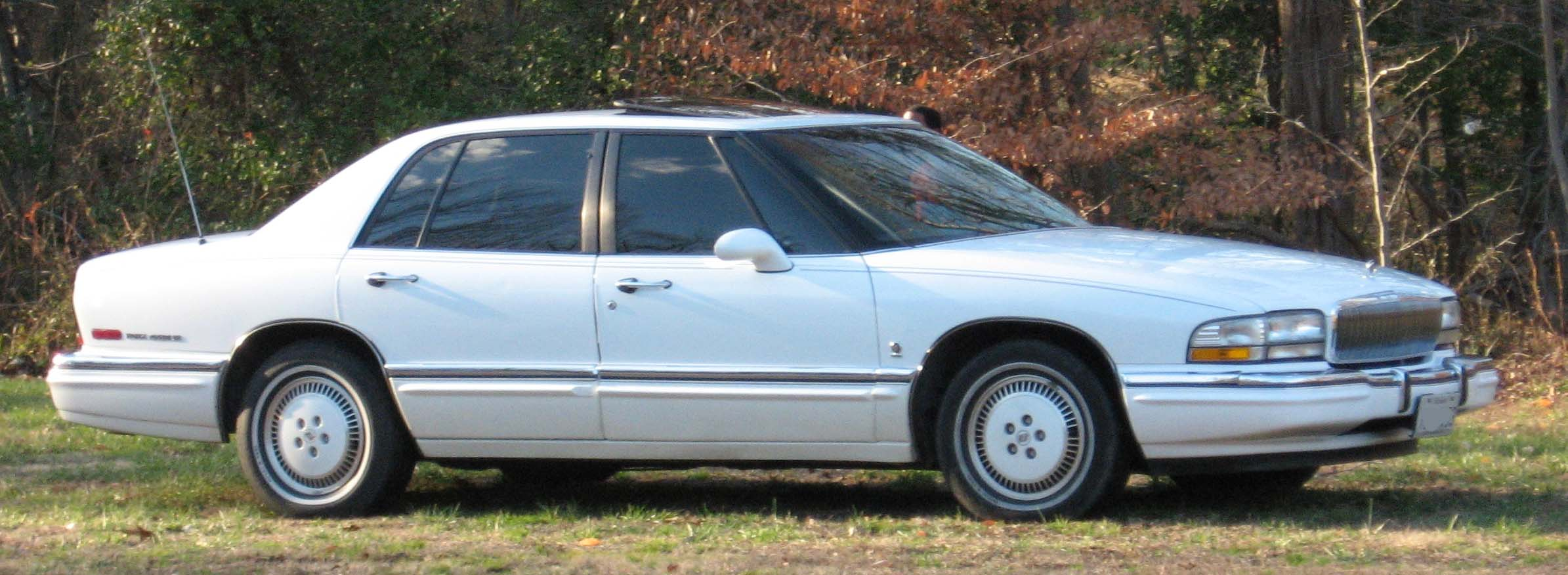

Overview
- Type: Passenger car
- Manufacturer: Buick
- Production: 1990–1996
- Model years: 1991–1996
- Assembly: Wentzville, Missouri, United States (Wentzville Assembly) 1991-1994; Flint, Michigan, United States (Buick City) 1994-1996
- Designer: Dave Holls (1988)

Body and chassis
- Body style: 4-door sedan
- Layout: Transverse front-engine, front-wheel drive
- Platform: C-body
- Related: Buick LeSabre; Cadillac Sixty Special; Cadillac Fleetwood; Cadillac DeVille; Cadillac Seville; Oldsmobile 98; Pontiac Bonneville

Powertrain
- Engine: 3800 V6 Series I L27 NA (91-94) 3800 V6 Series I L67 SC (91-95); 3800 V6 Series II L67 SC (1996) 3800 V6 Series II L36 NA (95-96)
- Power output: L27 series I: 170 hp (91-94); L36 series II: 205 hp (95-96); L67 series I: 205 hp (91-93); L67 series I: 225 (94-95); L67 Series II: 240hp (96)
- Transmission: 4-speed 4T60-E automatic

Dimensions
- Wheelbase: 110.8 in (2,814 mm)
- Length: 1991–93: 205.2 in (5,212 mm); 1994–96: 205.9 in (5,230 mm)
- Width: 1991–93: 74.9 in (1,902 mm); 1994–96: 74.1 in (1,882 mm)
- Height: 1991–93: 55.3 in (1,405 mm); 1994–96: 55.1 in (1,400 mm)
- Curb weight: 3,536 lb (1,604 kg)

Chronology
- Predecessor: Buick Electra

The 1991 Park Avenue, introduced in July 1990, used GM's C platform and was previewed by the 1989 Park Avenue Essence show car. Much of the Park Avenue's styling vocabulary made their way to subsequent Buick models restyled in the 1990s. Projections were for sales of 100,000 annually.

The Park Avenue was Buick's largest front-wheel-drive sedan, but the even larger rear-wheel-drive Roadmaster returned to the line for 1991 as a station wagon and 1992 as a sedan. However, the base Park Avenue was still priced higher than the Roadmaster Limited (its more luxurious trim). Park Avenue was marketed as the flagship of the Buick line.

This generation featured DynaRide, a deflected-disc strut valving system which first appeared as standard on the Electra, LeSabre, Riviera, and Skylark in 1988. Also included was an automatic level control system, where an air compressor pressurized the rear Chapman struts to maintain an overall level ride height. DynaRide and automatic level control were not available on vehicles equipped with the optional Gran Touring suspension package. Larger 16" aluminum wheels were also included with the package starting in 1992, while the standard model had 15" aluminum wheels.

The base-model Park Avenue featured a 3.8 L naturally-aspirated V6 engine and velour interior, upgradeable to leather. Starting in 1992, the Ultra came with a 3.8 L supercharged V6 engine and leather interior. The Park Avenue received various exterior and interior cosmetic changes, as well as powertrain updates, during this run. Some of the new options and features added to the first generation included driver (and later passenger) airbags, dual-zone climate control, traction control, and variable-effort steering (Ultra only).

Buick Park Avenue Production Figures
| | Yearly Total |
|---|---|
| 1991 | 117,075 |
| 1992 | 63,390 |
| 1993 | 55,210 |
| 1994 | 64,665 |
| 1995 | 62,994 |
| 1996 | 46,953 |
| Total | 410,287 |

=== Europe ===
The Park Avenue was available in Europe from 1991 until 1996 and varied from the North American version by featuring a truncated taillamps with separate amber turn signal indicators and red brake lamps, wider numberplate bezel, fitment of rear red fog lamps, headlamps with different lens pattern, white front side running markers, amber front turn signal indicators, side turn signal repeaters, "flagpole" external rear-view mirrors (mirrors on US version are fixed and do not turn), different door handles, some with a badge mounted directly to the hood rather than an ornament, stronger seat belt and anchors, "softer" air bags, metric speedometer and gauges. They are to comply with the European regulatory and safety standards. This generation of the Park Avenue was the last Buick to be officially marketed by GM in Europe. This move was to reduce the "cluttered" model range that confused the European consumers. After 1996, Cadillac and Chevrolet remained the sole General Motors North American brands to be sold in Europe.

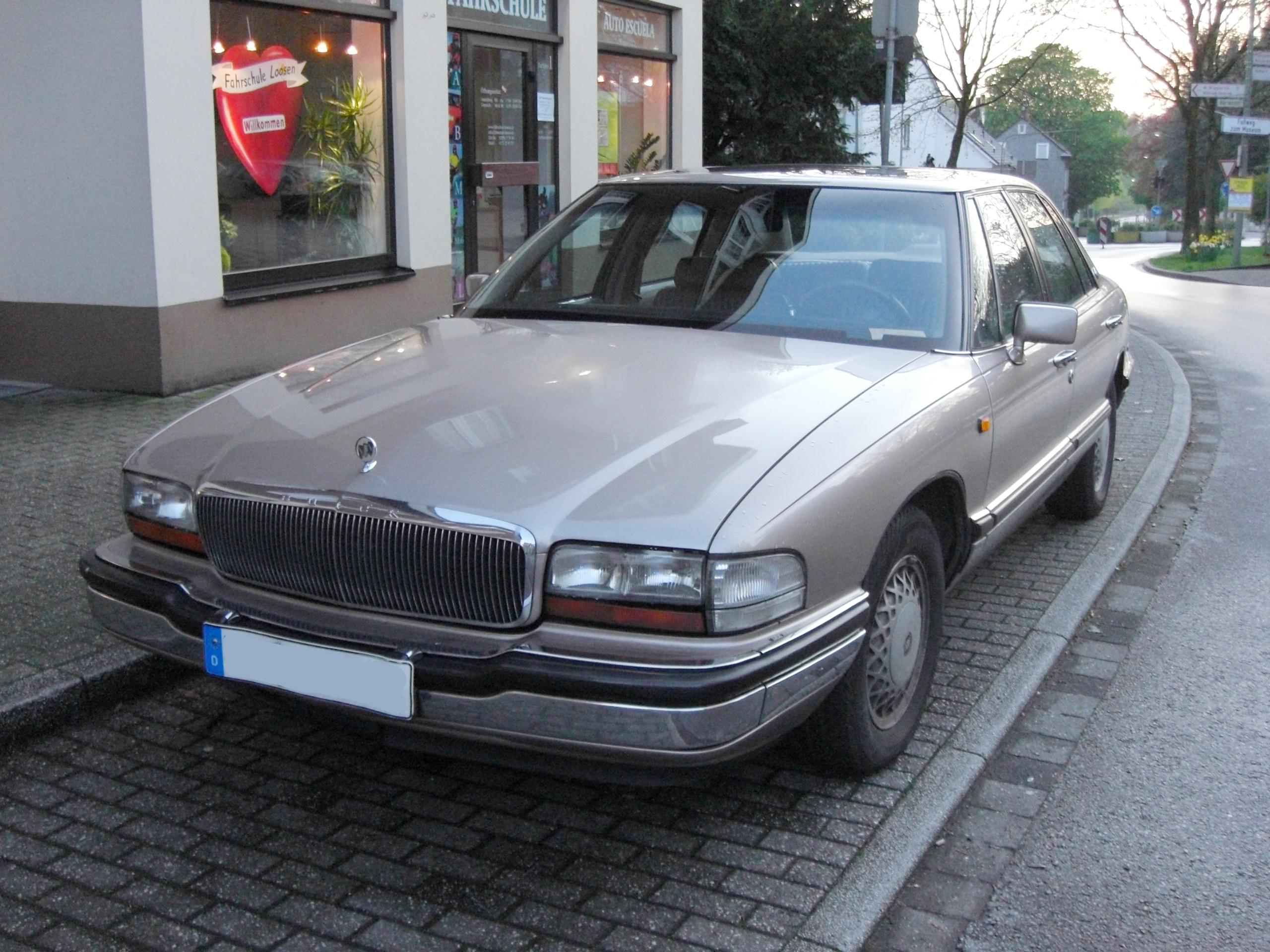
European-spec Park Avenue

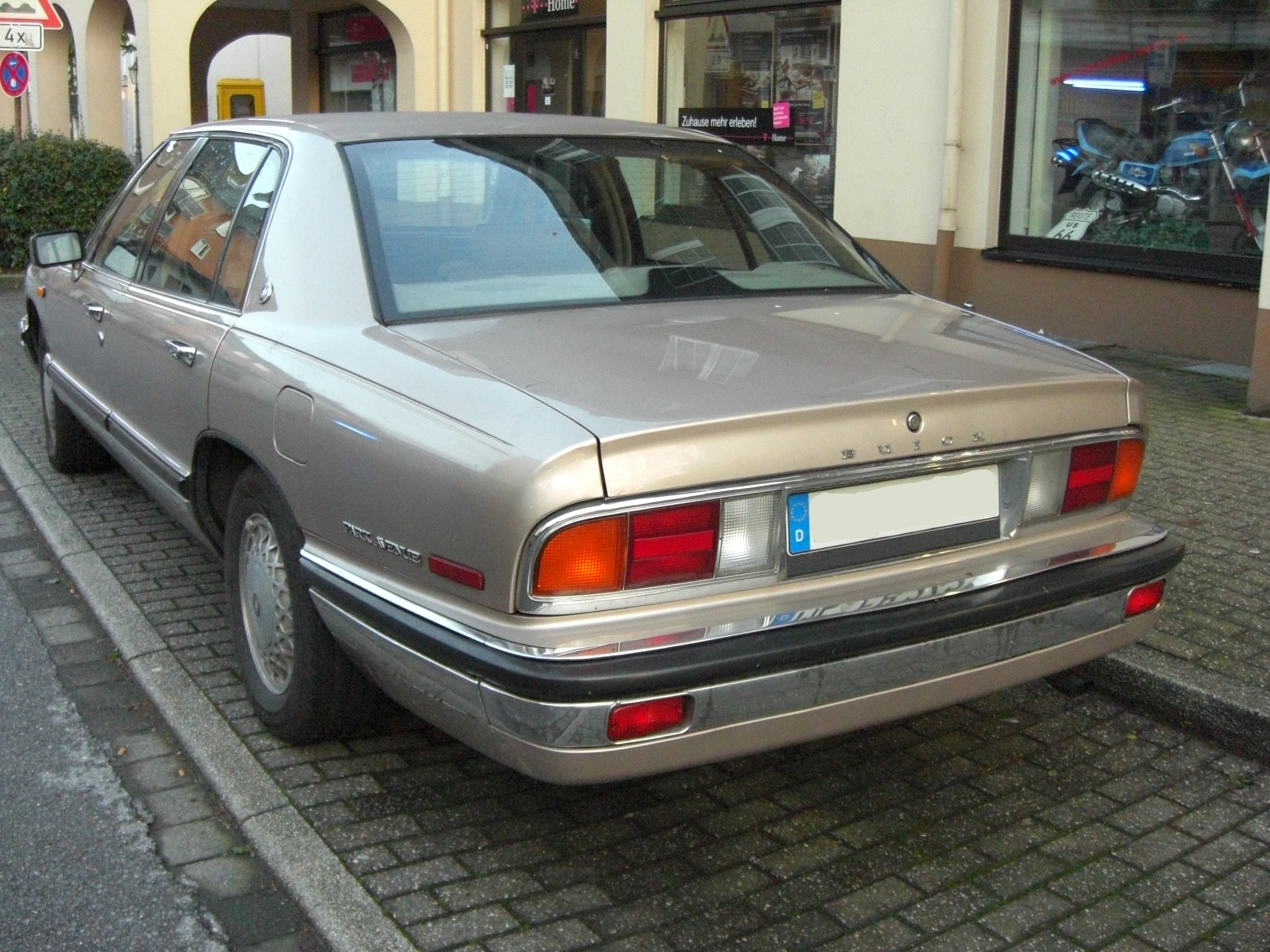
European-spec Park Avenue

== Second generation (1997–2005) ==
Second generation
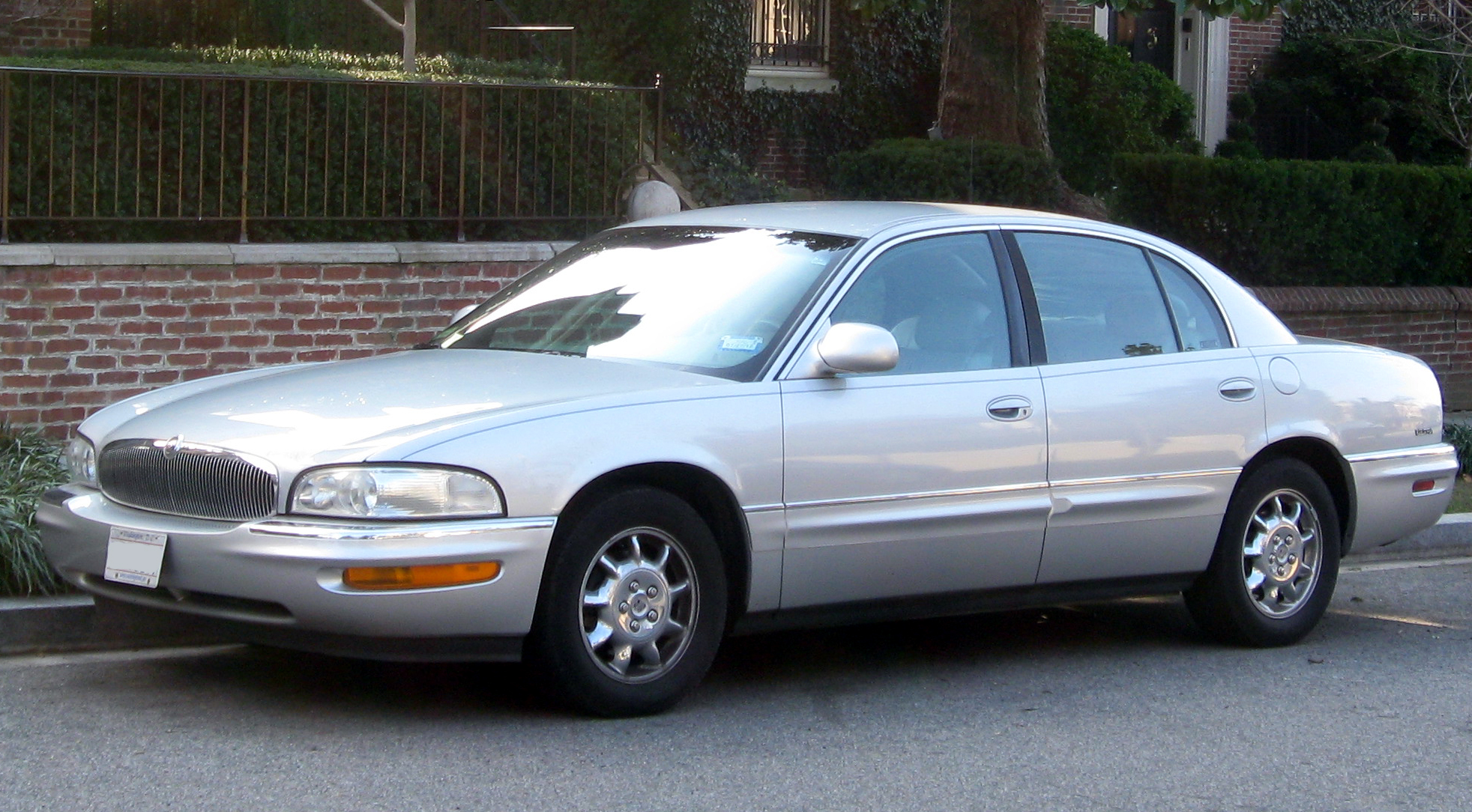

Overview
- Production: 1996–2004
- Model years: 1997–2005
- Assembly: Hamtramck, Michigan, United States (Detroit/Hamtramck Assembly); Lake Orion, Michigan, United States (Orion Assembly)
- Designer: Bill Porter

Body and chassis
- Body style: 4-door sedan
- Layout: Transverse front-engine, front-wheel drive
- Platform: G platform
- Related: Buick Riviera; Oldsmobile Aurora; Cadillac DeVille; Cadillac Seville; Buick LeSabre; Pontiac Bonneville

Powertrain
- Engine: 3.8 L Buick V6 (Series II); 3.8 L Buick V6 (Series II Supercharged)
- Transmission: 4-speed 4T65-E automatic 4-speed 4T65-E HD automatic

Dimensions
- Wheelbase: 113.8 in (2,890 mm)
- Length: 206.8 in (5,250 mm)
- Width: 74.7 in (1,900 mm)
- Height: 57.4 in (1,460 mm)
- Curb weight: 3,778–3,884 lb (1,714–1,762 kg)

An updated Park Avenue was released in October 1996 as a 1997 model, using GM's G platform, which was stronger and more substantial than its predecessor. GM chose to continue to refer to it as the C platform.

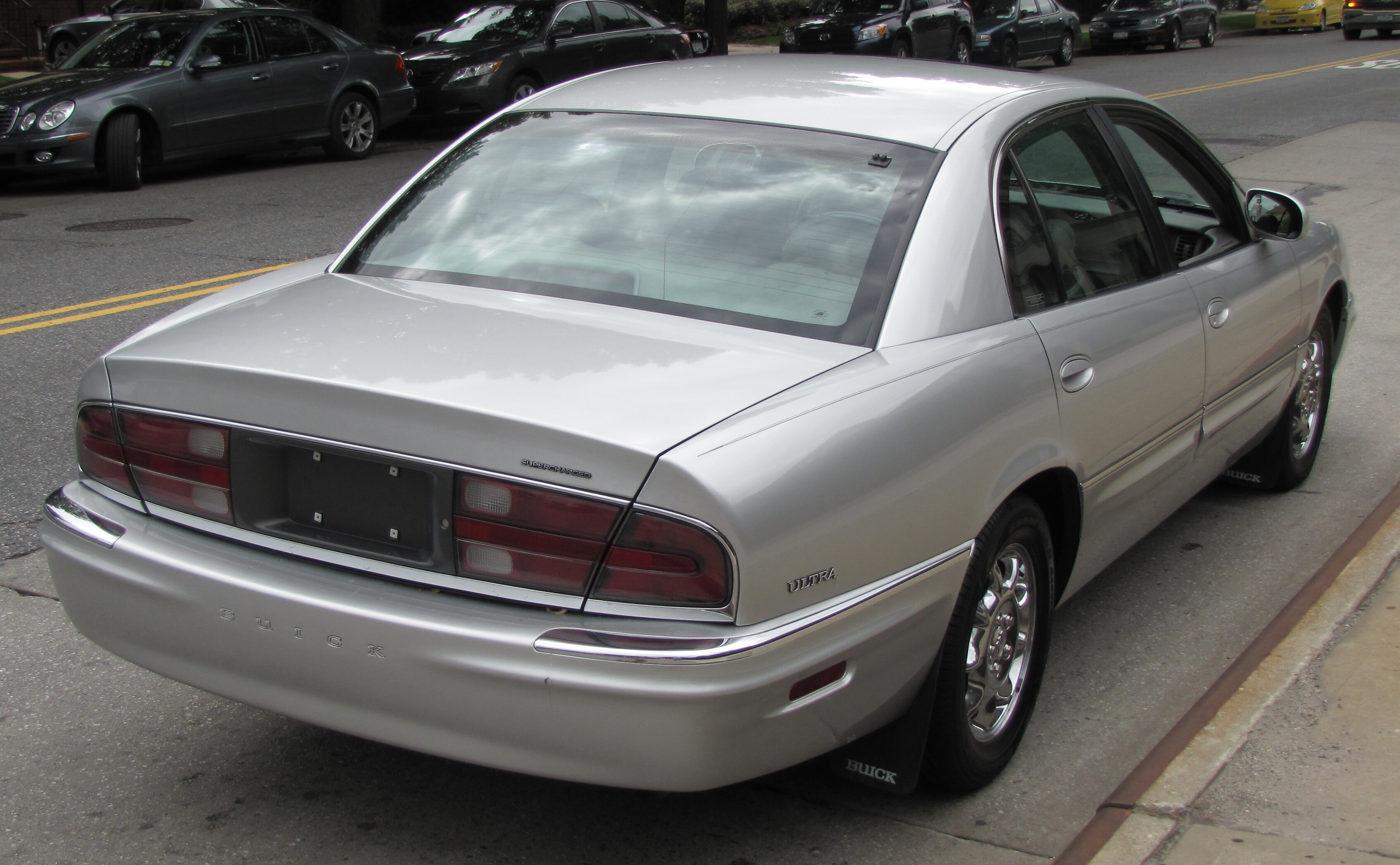
2000 Buick Park Avenue Ultra rear

The new generation was powered by updated Series II variants of the 3800 and as before, only Ultra models were supercharged. The base trim featured a hood ornament while the Ultra had a less conspicuous tri-shield inset on the upper edge of the grille. The base Park Avenue was the last USDM Buick to carry a factory hood ornament.

For 2001, the base model's cloth interior was dropped as an option in favor of standard leather trim. Ultrasonic rear park assist was a new option that year as well. For 2003, trademark Buick "Ventiports" returned on the Park Avenue Ultra along with a bolder grille that carried a larger monochromatic tri-shield badge in the center. New 17-inch wheels, a revised interior and revised instrument cluster were changed for the 2003 model year on the Ultra.

For 2005, the final model year in North America, base Park Avenues received a revised grille, and the previously Ultra-exclusive Ventiports. The rear fascia was also updated across the model line with a prominent chrome bar above the license plate holder with an embossed Park Avenue script and amber turn signal flashers.

The last 3,000 of 7,000 Park Avenues carried Special Edition badging that featured the namesake script underneath a silhouette of the New York City skyline. 300 of these were painted with a special two-tone black-on-platinum finish. Production ended on June 18, 2004. The Park Avenue was discontinued after 2005 in the North American market and was replaced in 2006 by the Buick Lucerne.

== Third generation (2007–2012) ==
Third generation
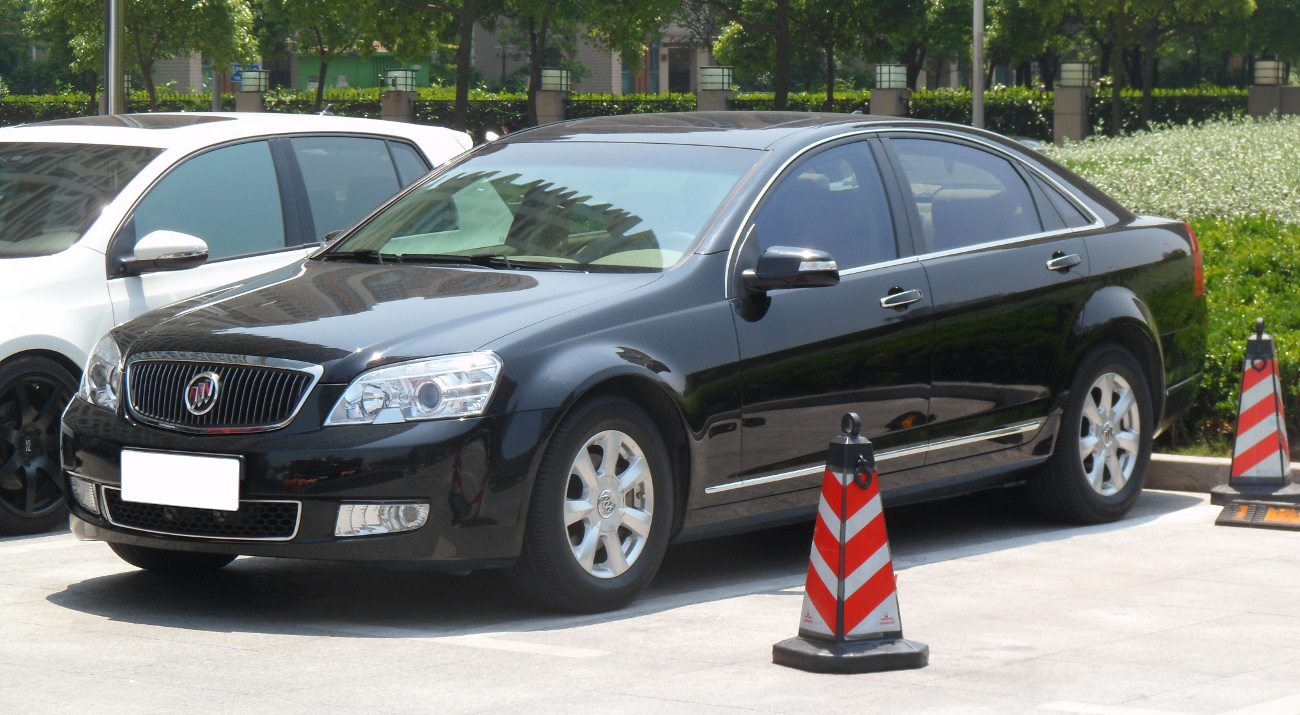

Overview
- Manufacturer: SAIC-GM
- Also called: Holden Caprice/Statesman; Chevrolet Caprice; Daewoo Veritas; Holden Special Vehicles Grange; Bitter Vero
- Production: 2007–2012
- Assembly: Adelaide, South Australia, Australia (Elizabeth) (All Parts); Shanghai, China (Final Assembly)
- Designer: James C. Shyr (2007; interior)

Body and chassis
- Body style: 4-door sedan
- Layout: FR layout
- Platform: GM Zeta platform
- Related: Holden Commodore; Pontiac G8; Chevrolet Camaro; Chevrolet Lumina

Powertrain
- Engine: 2.8 L LP1 V6; 3.0 L LF1 V6; 3.6 L LY7 V6
- Transmission: 5-speed GM 5L40E automatic (2007–2009); 6-speed GM 6L50E automatic (2010–2012)

Dimensions
- Wheelbase: 3,009 mm (118.5 in)
- Length: 5,175 mm (203.7 in)
- Width: 1,899 mm (74.8 in)
- Height: 1,480 mm (58.3 in)

Chronology
- Predecessor: Buick Royaum

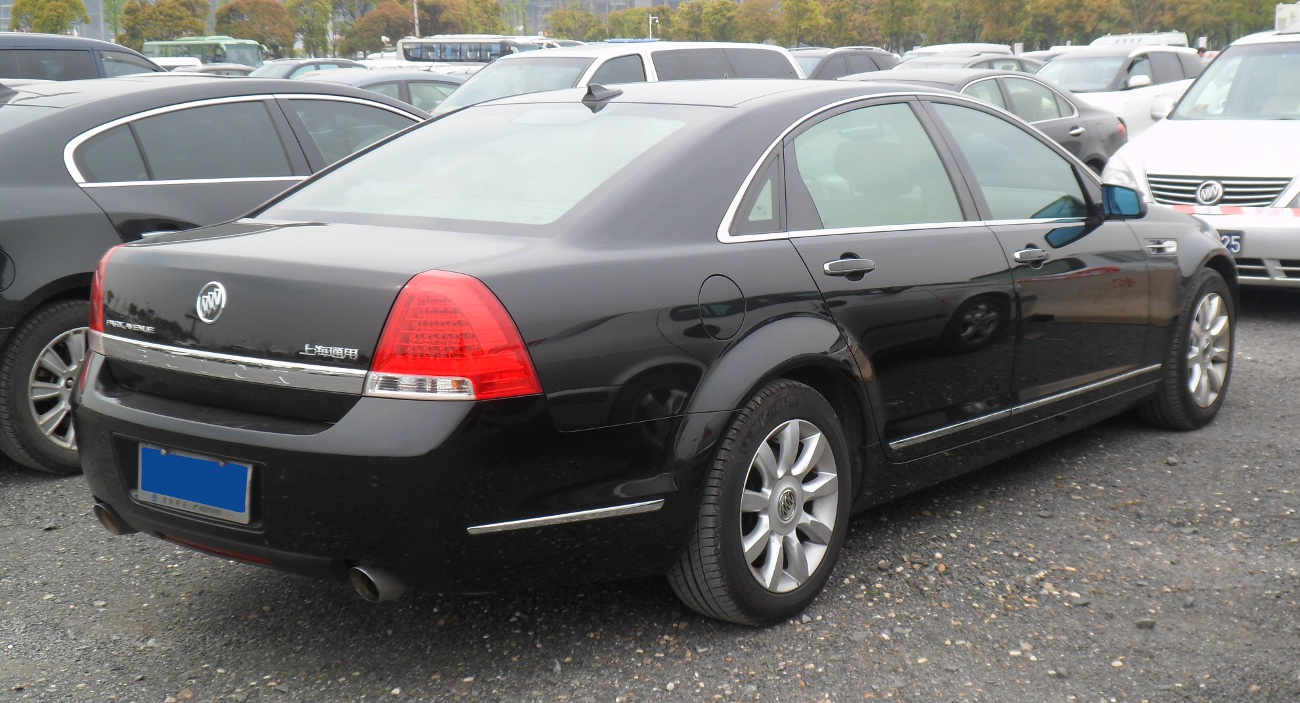
Back of the Buick Park Avenue

In April 2007, General Motors reintroduced the Park Avenue nameplate in China on a luxury sedan that replaced the Buick Royaum. Like its predecessor, the vehicle is based on the Australian-built Holden Caprice (this time on the contemporary WM/WN generation), though, unlike the Royaum, it was assembled by Shanghai GM from CKD kits shipped the Holden Elizabeth Plant in South Australia. It was offered in five trim levels: 舒适型 (Comfort), 精英型 (Elite), 豪华型 (Luxury - 2.8 only), 旗舰型 (Flagship) and 旗舰版 (Ultimate). The Ultimate was only available in 2010.

The Park Avenue was powered by Australian-built versions of the GM High Feature engine. The standard engines were the 2.8 L LP1 and the 3.6 L LY7 engine available as an option on the Elite and Flagship models from 2007 to 2009. The engine control unit is a Bosch E77 32-bit ECM processor.

| Type | Displacement | Power | Torque | Model years |
|---|---|---|---|---|
| 2.8 L LP1 V6 | 2,792 cc (170.4 cu in) | 150 kW (204 PS; 201 hp) at 6500 rpm | 265 N⋅m (195 lb⋅ft) at 2600 rpm | 2007–2009 |
| 3.6 L LY7 V6 | 3,564 cc (217.5 cu in) | 187 kW (254 PS; 251 hp) at 6600 rpm | 340 N⋅m (251 lb⋅ft) at 2800 rpm | 2007–2009 |
| 3.0 L LF1 V6 | 2,994 cc (182.7 cu in) | 187 kW (254 PS; 251 hp) at 6700 rpm | 296 N⋅m (218 lb⋅ft) at 2900 rpm | 2010–2012 |

In 2010, only one engine option was offered, a 3 L SIDI which replaced the old 2.8 V6 and 3.6 V6 due to fuel consumption. The 2.8 litre engine was rated at 11.4 litres per 100 kilometres (20.6 MPG US) and the 3.6 litre engine at 11.6 litres per 100 kilometres (20.3 MPG US) respectively. The new 3-litre engine was rated 10.9 litres per 100 kilometres (21.6 MPG US). The third-generation Park Avenue remained a China exclusive and was never offered by Buick in North America. A version of the car did eventually see release in the US market as the stripped down, rebadged Chevrolet Caprice PPV (Police Patrol Vehicle).

It was discontinued in China in October 2012.
