= Orion Assembly =

Building

- Operated: 1983–present
- Location: 4555 Giddings Road; Orion Township, Michigan, United States
- Coordinates: 42.7172°N 83.262°W
- Industry: Automotive
- Products: Automobiles
- Employees: 1,228 (2022)
- Area: 433 acres (1.75 km^{2})
- Volume: 4,300,000 sq ft (400,000 m^{2})
- Owner: General Motors
- Website: gm.com/company/facilities/orion

Orion Assembly is an automotive assembly plant in Orion Township, Michigan, United States, owned and operated by General Motors. Starting in early 2027, the plant is slated to assemble the light-duty versions of the Chevrolet Silverado and GMC Sierra pickup trucks, as well as the Cadillac Escalade for the U.S. market. Opened in 1983, Orion Assembly assumed operations of Buick City in Flint, and Pontiac Assembly. The 4,300,000 sq ft (400,000 m^{2}) plant had approximately 1,032 salaried and hourly employees as of September 2019.

== History ==
Orion Assembly commenced production on December 1, 1983 with the 1985 model C-body cars. Orion Assembly produced the Chevrolet Malibu and Pontiac G6 until 2009, when the plant was idled due to the General Motors Chapter 11 reorganization of 2009. The plant in suburban Detroit was saved from closure through a $1 billion grants and tax incentives from the state of Michigan, local municipalities and the federal government. Under an agreement with the UAW, the plant began assembling the successor to the South Korean-built Chevrolet Aveo, the Chevrolet Sonic, in 2011 — making it the only subcompact car then assembled in the United States. Later in 2011, the plant began manufacturing the Buick Verano.

In the past, GM assembled subcompact vehicles in Mexico or in South Korea due to lower cost labor rates in those countries. Under the new agreement with the UAW, GM used domestic laborers earning less than under previous contracts and slimmed down labor rules to make assembling subcompact vehicles in the US economically competitive. For younger workers, wages were cut in half from the standard $28/hour. For the first time, parts supplier employees worked alongside of GM workers on the assembly line. They made as little as $10/hour. This arrangement replaced GM's previous plan to import a new subcompact vehicle from China. Orion's bid was selected over those from plants in Wisconsin (Janesville Assembly), and Tennessee (Spring Hill Assembly).

On March 22, 2019, GM announced an additional investment of $300 million and an addition of 400 workers to build a new electric vehicle at Orion. This was later revealed to be a slightly larger version of the Bolt to be known as the Bolt EUV.

In 2023, GM announced that it will discontinue the production of Chevrolet Bolt at the end of 2023, with that the Orion plant will be reopened as the Orion EV Assembly in 2024, to produce electric pickup trucks such as the Chevrolet Silverado EV and the GMC Sierra EV. With $4 billion in additional investment at the facility, GM CEO Mary Barra announced that "employment will nearly triple (from 2023) and we'll have a companywide capacity to build 600,000 electric trucks annually."

GM has pushed back the production schedule for its electric trucks at the Orion Township plant in Michigan. Originally set to start in late 2024, the production of models like the Chevy Silverado EV and GMC Sierra EV is now slated for the end of 2025. The company says the delay is due to a need to align its investment strategy with the slower-than-expected uptake in EV demand. Hourly workers at GM's Orion plant are not being left in the lurch with the EV production pushback. They get job offers at other Michigan facilities, like Factory Zero, which is gearing up to boost its production next year.

In July 2025, GM announced its intention to build ICE powered trucks and full-size SUVs at the Orion site to supplement its current factories in Texas, Indiana, Canada, and Mexico - reversing course from its previous plans to assemble electric vehicles at Orion.

In November 2025, due to an anticipated increase in vehicle production in 2027, GM invested $4 billion in three plants: Orion Assembly, Fairfax Assembly, and Spring Hill Manufacturing.

== Controversy ==
After GM announced the plan to construct a new factory, opposition to the plant in Orion Township came from three separate groups: those who disliked the fact that GM had selected the site without first notifying township officials (a land option was previously given to Grand Trunk Railway by township officials without first informing the public, which then was negotiated for GM by Argonaut Realty); pilots who opposed its location on land which was at the time partially occupied by the Oakland-Pontiac Airport; and from the community group Area Citizens for a Rural Environment (ACRE) who opposed the factory over environmental concerns. GM initiated a community relations campaign in Orion Township to encourage support. While groundbreaking was intended for June, the construction of the factory was briefly delayed by an ACRE referendum opposing the construction of the factory, which received enough signatures to be placed on the ballot. At the August 6, 1980 election in Orion Township, the construction of the plant was approved by 90% of voters, and groundbreaking took place shortly after.

== Dedication ceremony ==
On July 5, 1984, President Ronald Reagan gave a ceremonial dedication speech at the plant. Also in attendance were Michigan Governor James Blanchard, Michigan Senators Carl Levin and Don Riegle, Representative (from the local district) William Broomfield and notable General Motors executives, including chairman and CEO Roger Smith.

During his speech, Reagan commended both GM and the United Auto Workers for their progress in the automotive industry.

== Vehicles produced ==
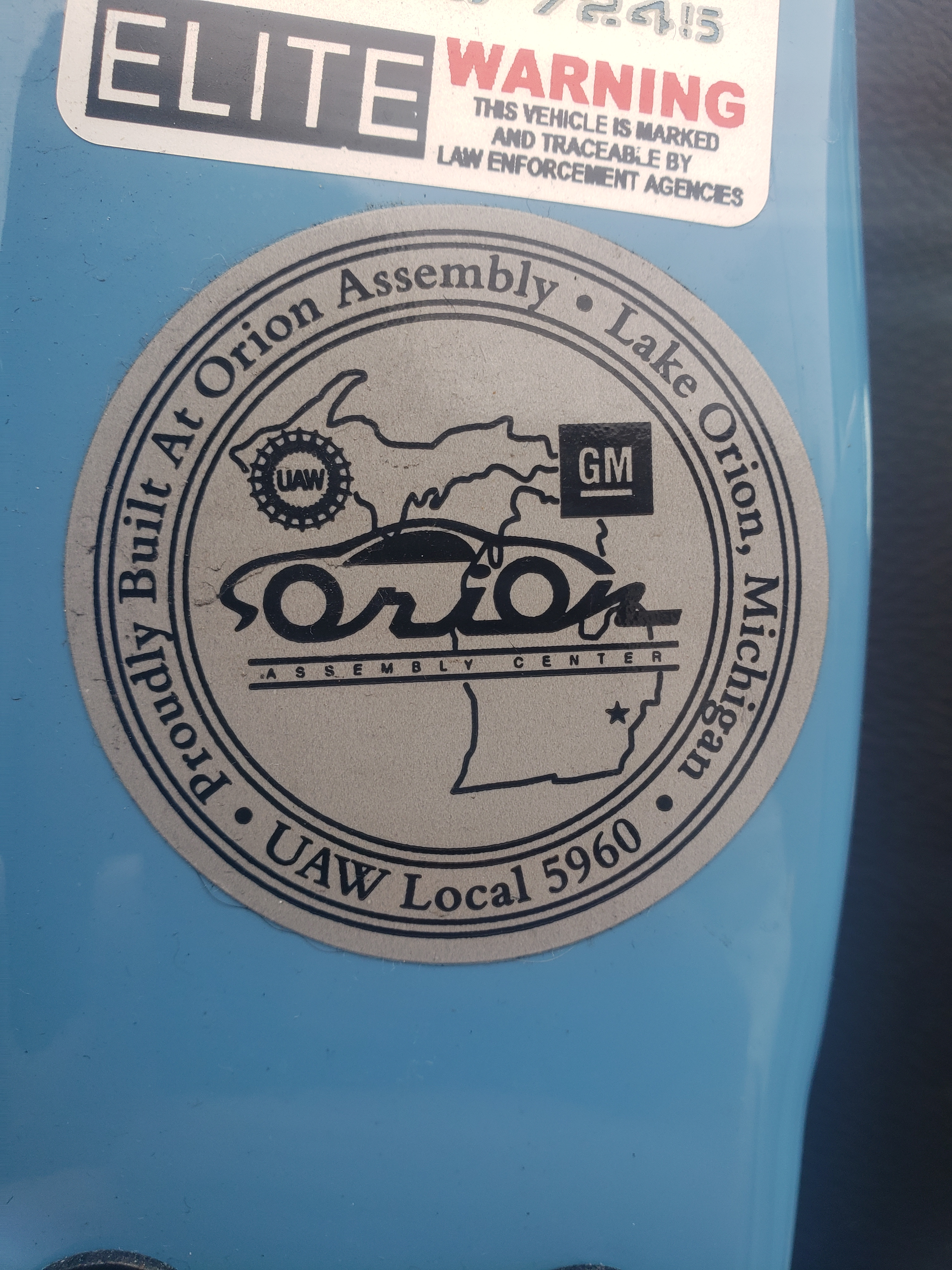
Orion Assembly sticker on a Chevrolet Sonic

=== Upcoming ===
Starting early 2027:

- Chevrolet Silverado 1500
- GMC Sierra 1500
- Cadillac Escalade

=== Past ===
- 2022–2023 Chevrolet Bolt EUV
- 2017–2023 Chevrolet Bolt
- 2017–2019 Opel Ampera-e
- 2012–2017 Buick Verano
- 2012–2020 Chevrolet Sonic
- 2008–2010 Chevrolet Malibu
- 2005–2010 Pontiac G6
- 2000–2005 Buick LeSabre
- 1997–2005 Buick Park Avenue
- 1995–2003 Oldsmobile Aurora
- 1995–1999 Buick Riviera
- 1994–1998, 2000–2005 Pontiac Bonneville
- 1994–1999 Oldsmobile 88
- 1987–1993 Cadillac Sixty Special
- 1985–1990 Buick Electra
- 1985–1996 Oldsmobile 98
- 1985–1993 Cadillac DeVille
- 1985–1992 Cadillac Fleetwood
