= General Motors K platform (RWD) =

GM K platform (RWD)
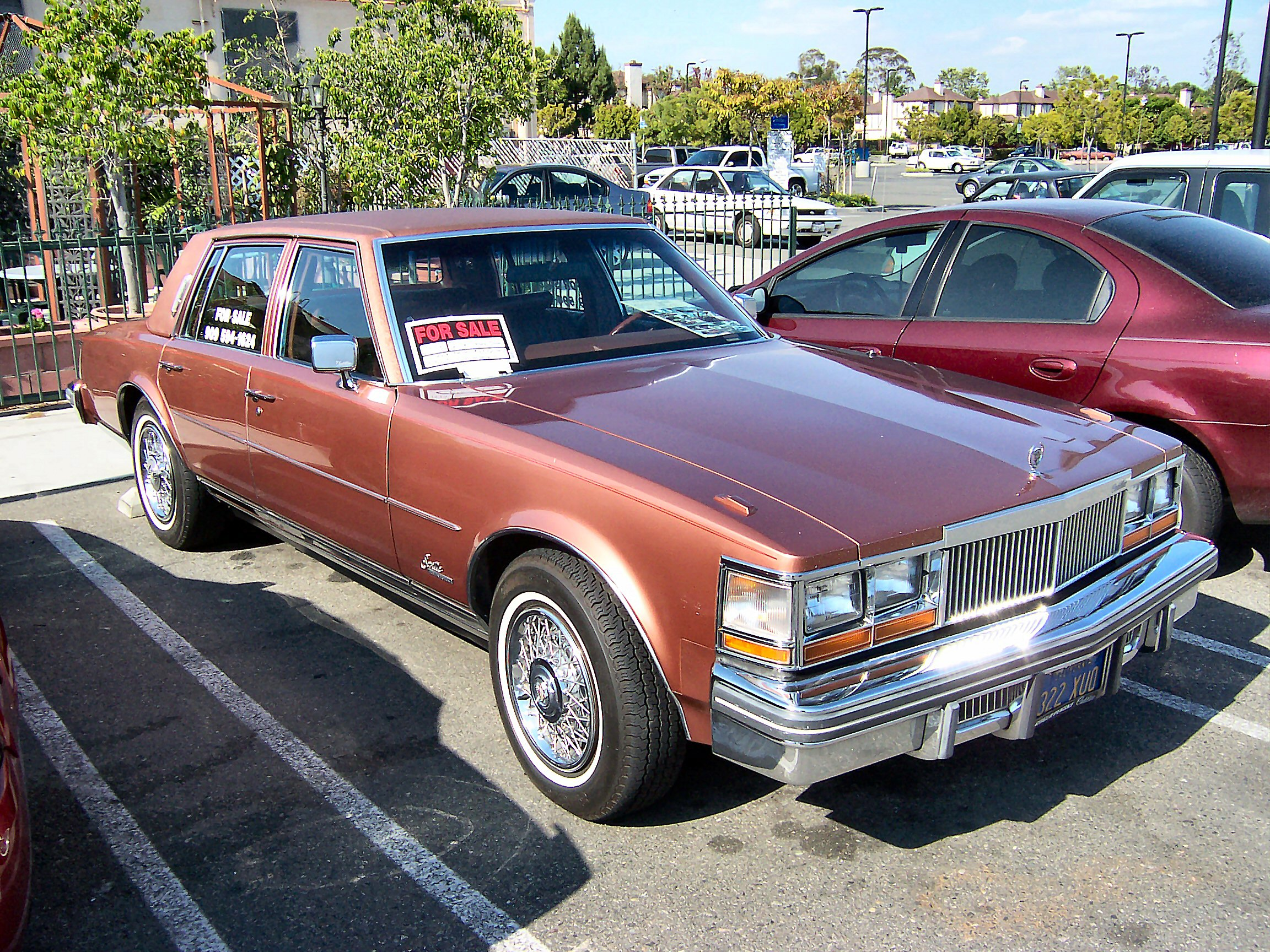
- 1978 Cadillac Seville

Overview
- Manufacturer: General Motors
- Also called: K-Body
- Production: 1975–1979

Body and chassis
- Class: Mid-size
- Layout: FR layout
- Body style: 4-door sedan
- Vehicles: Cadillac Seville
- Related: GM F platform GM X platform GM V platform GM A platform GM G platform

Powertrain
- Engines: 350 cu in (5.7 L) Oldsmobile V8; 350 cu in (5.7 L) Oldsmobile diesel V8
- Transmission: 3-speed automatic

Dimensions
- Wheelbase: 114.3 in (2,903 mm)

Chronology
- Successor: GM K platform (FWD)

The General Motors K platform (commonly called the K-body) was the automobile platform designation used for the rear wheel drive Cadillac Seville midsize luxury models from 1975 to 1979.

The rear-wheel drive K platform was based closely on the very similar 4th generation GM X platform, and 2nd generation F-bodies of the 1970s, all of which shared many components (control arms, springs, steering linkage and associated steering gear) in common. The K platform stretched the X platform to 114.3 inch wheelbase, but also improved isolation from sources of structure-borne vibration in the drivetrain and suspension. While automobiles built on these three platforms had different bodies, they shared the same unibody construction technology using a separable elastomer isolated front subframe assembly, a design which first appeared in GM vehicles on the 1st generation X platform in 1962 on the Chevy II. Automobiles built on these three platforms (F, K, and X) also shared front and rear suspension systems, with tunings engineered to each application.

The front suspensions used unequal length A-arms, coil springs damped with tubular hydraulic shock absorbers, ball joints, elastomer bushings, and recirculating ball steering boxes differing in ratios that were specific to the application. The rear suspension design used a live axle (solid axle - which was a GM corporate 10 bolt differential with an 8.5" ring gear) located by leaf springs (shared with the 1968-74 and 1975-79 X platform) damped with tubular hydraulic shock absorbers. Rear disc brakes were standard equipment in 1977 - this design later ended up with some 1979-81 Pontiac Trans Ams with the WS6 option. At the same time the rear disc brakes were made standard equipment the front brakes received a modified steering knuckle which used a 12-inch disc brake rotor (shared with the GM B platform station wagons and C/D platform except limousines and commercial chassis) - the wheel bolt pattern was changed from the GM 5 x 4.75 (used with Chevrolets and lower end BOP automobiles) to the 5 on 5 bolt pattern used with the rest of the Cadillac RWD lineup (also with higher end BOP automobiles and Chevrolet/GMC 1/2 ton light duty trucks, vans, and SUVs).

In 1980, the Cadillac Seville was moved to the GM K platform (FWD) platform, similar to the GM E platform-based Cadillac Eldorado.

Applications:

- Cadillac Seville (1975–1979)

== See also ==
- List of General Motors platforms
- General Motors K platform
