= General Motors K platform (FWD) =

GM K platform (FWD)
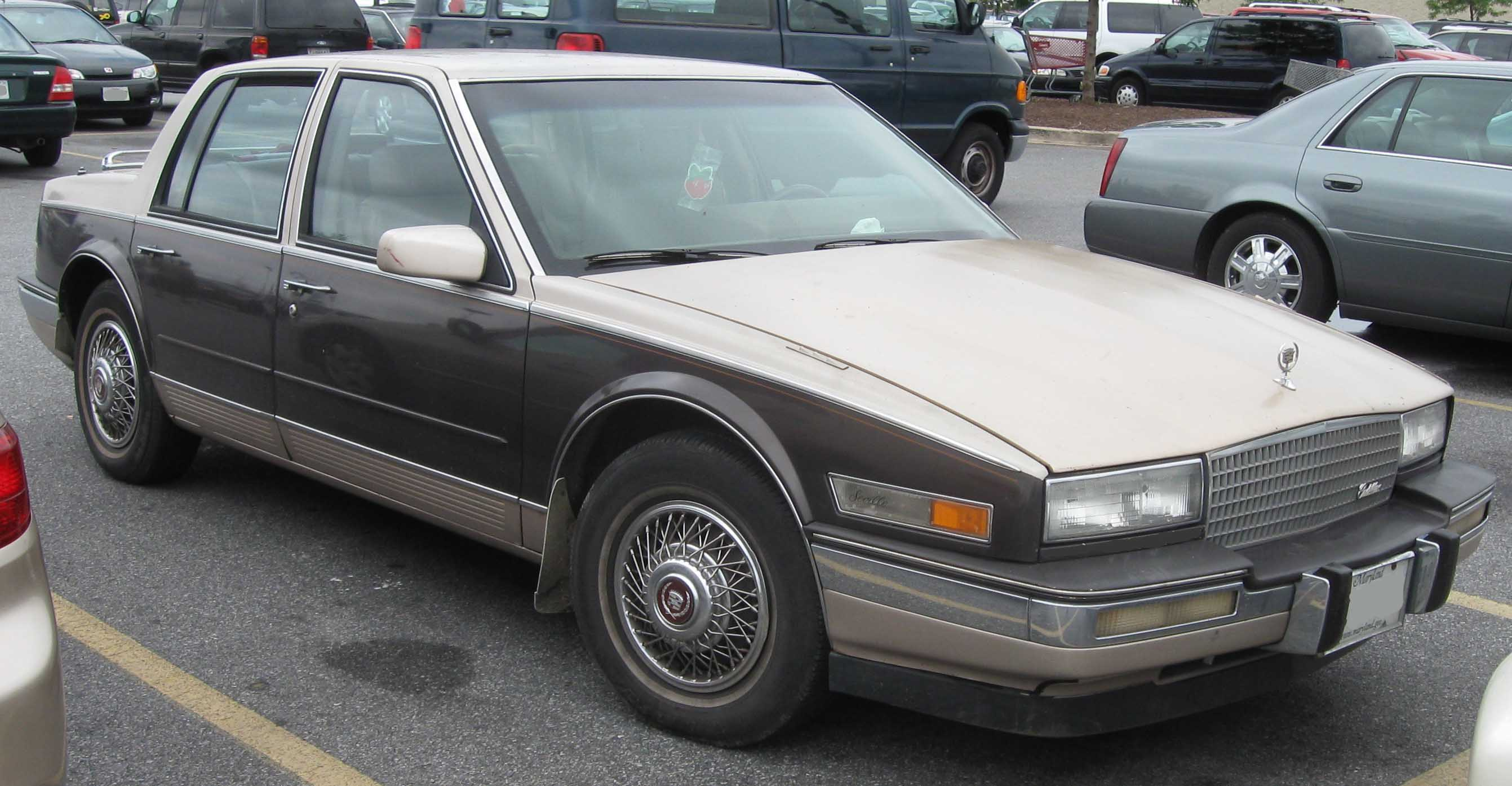
- 1986-1988 Cadillac Seville

Overview
- Manufacturer: General Motors
- Also called: K-Body
- Production: 1980–1999

Body and chassis
- Body style: 4-door sedan
- Vehicles: Cadillac Sedan Deville; Cadillac Seville
- Related: GM C platform (FWD); GM H platform (FWD); GM G platform (FWD); GM E platform

Chronology
- Predecessor: GM K platform
- Successor: GM G platform

The General Motors K platform (commonly called the K-body) was an automobile platform designation used for front wheel drive Cadillac models beginning in 1980. It replaced the rear wheel drive K platform.

The K-body designation was used for sedans; similar coupe models used the nearly identical GM E platform. The GM G platform (FWD) was also based on the K. Beginning in 1986 K- and E-bodies were produced at GM's high-tech Detroit/Hamtramck Assembly plant. Unlike the E-body, the K designation has been exclusive to Cadillac.

The original FWD K-body Cadillac Seville was shared with the downsized E-body Cadillac Eldorado beginning in 1980. In 1986, the Seville was replaced with an even smaller front wheel drive model, also given the K designation. This new model featured a transversely mounted engine instead of a longitudinally mounted one like its predecessor. The Seville was lengthened in 1992, and the DeVille was moved from the GM C platform to the K platform in 1994. Starting with the 1998 Cadillac Seville, the K platform vehicles were moved to the G platform, however GM continued to call it the K platform.

== Vehicles ==
- 1980–1997 Cadillac Seville
- 1994–1999 Cadillac (Sedan) DeVille

== See also ==
- List of General Motors platforms
- General Motors K platform
