= General Motors G platform (RWD) =

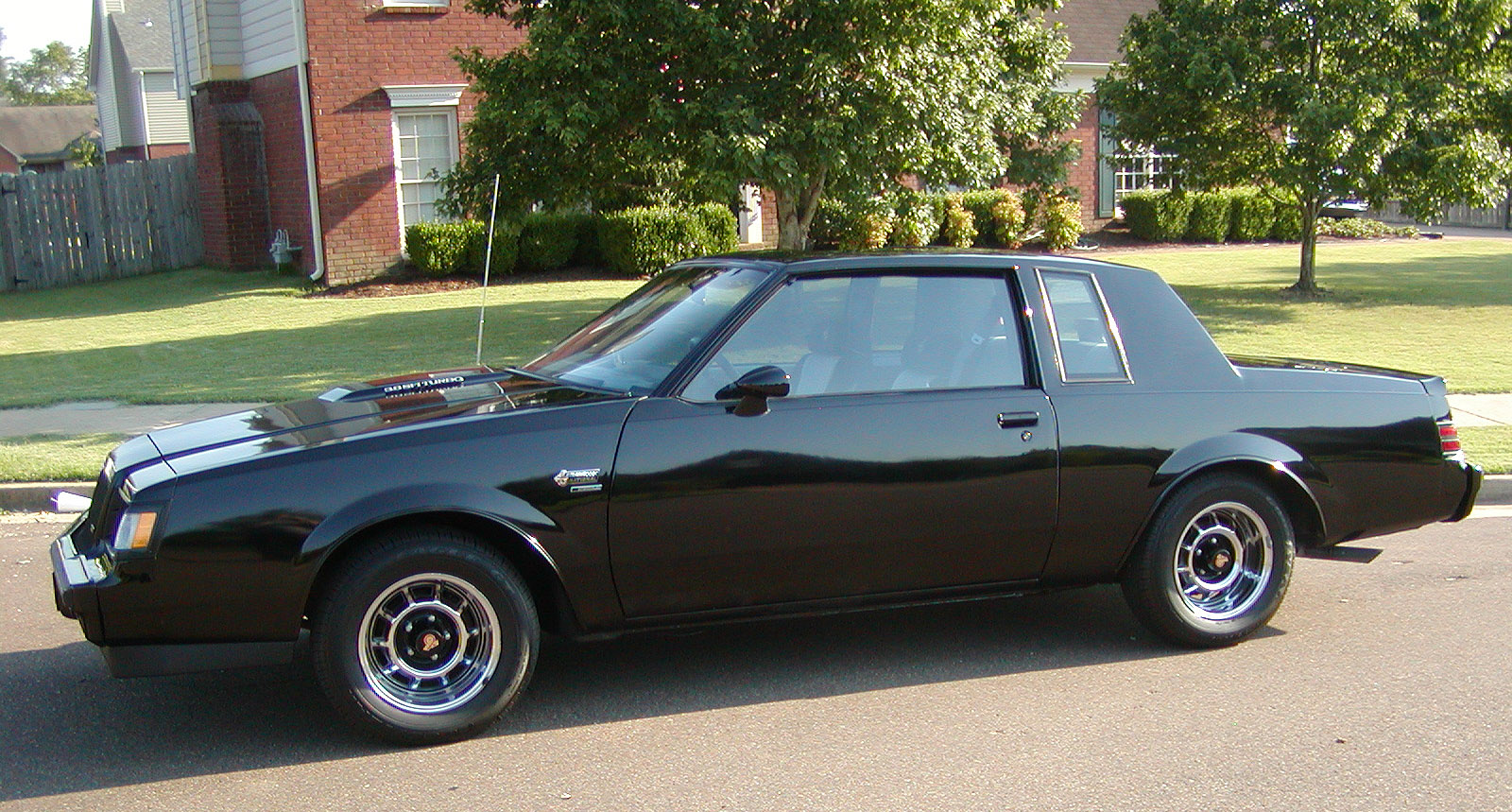
- 1987 Buick Grand National

Overview
- Manufacturer: General Motors
- Also called: G-Special (2-door coupes)
- Production: 1982–1988

Body and chassis
- Class: Mid-size car
- Layout: FR layout
- Body styles: 2-door coupe 4-door sedan 5-door station wagon 2-door coupé utility pickup
- Vehicles: Buick Regal; Chevrolet El Camino; Chevrolet Monte Carlo; GMC Caballero; Oldsmobile Cutlass Supreme; Pontiac Bonneville; Pontiac Grand Prix
- Related: General Motors A platform (1978-1981)

Dimensions
- Wheelbase: 108.0 in (2,743 mm); 117.0 in (2,972 mm) (El Camino and Caballero only)

Chronology
- Predecessor: General Motors A platform (RWD)
- Successor: General Motors A platform (FWD); General Motors H platform (FWD); General Motors W platform

The G platform (also called G-body) is an automobile platform designation that General Motors used for its intermediate (mid-size) car lines. Adapted from the rear-wheel drive A platform, two versions of the G platform were produced; first from 1969 to 1972 and again from 1982 to 1988. While primarily associated with personal luxury coupes, the second-generation G platform underpinned coupes, sedans, station wagons, and coupe utility pickups. As with its A platform predecessor, the G platform was marketed by every GM division (with the exception of Cadillac).

The final American-market midsize cars produced with body-on-frame construction, the G platform would also become the final American rear-wheel drive sedan platform designed by GM in the 20th century. During its production, GM began to replace G-body vehicles with front-wheel drive vehicles from the A platform and the H platform, with the 1988 GM10/W platform serving as its ultimate replacement.

During the mid-1990s and 2000s, the G platform designation was revived, denoting GM front-wheel drive full-size and luxury sedans.

== Use ==
=== 1970s ===
General Motors introduced the G platform designation for 1969, when Pontiac introduced the third-generation Grand Prix, which shifted its chassis from the full-size B-body to the A-body. Though using a two-door body, it was designed with a 118-inch wheelbase (two inches longer than A-body four-door sedans); the designation was also applied to the introduction of the Chevrolet Monte Carlo coupe, which used the 116-inch wheelbase of the Chevelle four-door sedan.

For the 1973 "Colonnade" redesign of the A-body line, the Grand Prix and Monte Carlo again shared underpinnings with the A-body line, replacing the G-platform underpinning with "A-Special". While sharing a similar formal-style roofline with the Oldsmobile Cutlass Supreme and Buick Century (later, Buick Regal), the Grand Prix and Monte Carlo again shared a longer 116-inch wheelbase with A-platform sedans.

For 1978, GM downsized its A platform model lines (in following the 1977 redesign of its full-size B and C platforms). Along with adopting a much smaller exterior footprint, GM ended its practice of using separate wheelbases for each bodystyle, adopting a 108-inch wheelbase for each model (with the exception of the Chevrolet El Camino and GMC Caballero). Internally, the A-Special coupe designation remained, applied to the Buick Regal, Chevrolet Monte Carlo, Oldsmobile Cutlass Supreme, and Pontiac Grand Prix; while again having a formal-style notchback roofline, each of the four model lines were styled differently from one another.

=== 1982–1988 ===
For 1982, GM redesigned and downsized the A platform again, shifting it to front-wheel drive. However, the new platform was not intended to replace the entire model family directly, so GM redesignated its remaining rear-wheel drive midsize vehicles under a revived G platform designation (including the quartet of G-Special coupes).

The introduction of the front-wheel drive A-body involved several model changes for each division. For Buick, the Century shifted entirely to the new platform, with the Regal adopting its station wagon and sedan (dropped in 1984 and 1985, respectively). Chevrolet gradually phased out the Malibu in favor of the front-wheel drive Celebrity; the Malibu coupe was dropped for 1982, with the entire line ending for 1983. Oldsmobile replaced its Cutlass sedans with the Cutlass Ciera, keeping its Cutlass Supreme sedans and coupes (along with the 442); the Cutlass Cruiser wagon moved to the A platform for 1984. Pontiac made would make several changes; while the Grand Prix was unaffected, the LeMans was dropped in the US (the Grand LeMans sedan and wagon continued in Canada through 1983). Pontiac also downsized the Bonneville for 1982 to the mid-size segment (utilizing the body of the Cutlass Supreme sedan).

For 1984, station wagons were introduced to the front-wheel drive A platform, leading to the discontinuation of G platform station wagons. For 1986, GM introduced its front-wheel drive H platform to replace multiple B platform model lines, leading Buick to drop its Regal sedan; Pontiac shifted the Bonneville to the H platform for 1987.

1987 marked the final full year of production for the G platform; the Monte Carlo and Cutlass Supreme were produced for a shortened 1988 model year, with both ending assembly at the end of 1987. While the El Camino and Caballero were retired without replacement, the Regal, Cutlass Supreme, and Grand Prix were moved to the front-wheel drive GM10 platform (today, W platform). For 1990, Chevrolet debuted its GM10 vehicle, introducing the Chevrolet Lumina to replace the Monte Carlo and the Celebrity under a single model line.

== Vehicles ==
Model name	Model years	Configuration	Predecessor	Successor	Notes
Buick Regal	1982–1987	2-door coupe (1982-1987); 4-door sedan (1982-1984); 5-door station wagon (1982-1983)	Buick Century (A platform RWD)	Coupe: Buick Regal (W platform) Sedan: Buick LeSabre and Buick Electra (H/C platform FWD) Wagon: Buick Century (A platform FWD)	For 1982, Buick expanded its Regal line (sold only as a coupe since 1978) by repackaging the previous Buick Century sedan and station wagon under the Regal model line. For 1984, the Regal station wagon was discontinued, following the introduction of the front-wheel drive Buick Century wagon (becoming the final Regal station wagon until 2018); a year later, the Regal sedan was also retired to accommodate the downsizing of the Buick LeSabre and Buick Electra. The G platform Regal was sold with high-performance turbocharged Grand National and T-Type variants. Limited-production GNX is most powerful version of G platform.
Chevrolet El Camino	1982–1987	2-door coupe utility pickup	Chevrolet El Camino (A platform)	N/A	Built on longer-wheelbase (117 inches) chassis, shared only with GMC Caballero. Shares front bodywork with Chevrolet Malibu (including El Camino SS); rear bumper and tailgate are shared with Malibu station wagon. Final generation of the model line; functionally replaced by Chevrolet S10 compact pickup truck.
Chevrolet Malibu	1982–1983	4-door sedan; 5-door station wagon	Chevrolet Malibu (A platform)	Chevrolet Celebrity	For 1982, Chevrolet introduced the Celebrity as the successor of the Malibu, leading Chevrolet to drop the 2-door Malibu from the G platform. The front fascia was restyled with quad headlamps (looking more like the Impala/Caprice) After 1983, the G platform Malibu was replaced entirely by the Celebrity.
Chevrolet Monte Carlo	1982–1988	2-door coupe	Chevrolet Monte Carlo (A platform)	Chevrolet Lumina	For 1983, the Chevrolet Monte Carlo SS was introduced, featuring a reshaped front fascia used by Chevrolet for stock-car racing. For 1986, Chevrolet introduced the LS with flush-mounted headlamp lenses and the SS Aerocoupe, featuring an aerodynamically-curved rear window. The Monte Carlo was produced for a shortened 1988 model year (ending in December 1987); the model line was replaced by the 1990 Chevrolet Lumina (along with the Chevrolet Celebrity).
GMC Caballero	1982–1987	2-door coupe utility pickup	GMC Caballero (A platform)	N/A	Built on longer-wheelbase (117 inches) chassis, shared only with Chevrolet El Camino. Shares nearly its entire bodywork with the Chevrolet El Camino, itself derived from 1982-1983 Chevrolet Malibu station wagon. The GMC Caballero Diablo is the equivalent to the El Camino SS. Only generation of the model line; functionally replaced by GMC S15/Sonoma compact pickup truck.
Oldsmobile Cutlass Supreme Oldsmobile Cutlass Supreme Classic	1982–1987 1988 (Cutlass Supreme Classic)	2-door coupe 4-door sedan	Oldsmobile Cutlass Supreme (A platform)	Sedan: Oldsmobile Cutlass Ciera, Oldsmobile Cutlass Supreme (W platform) Coupe: Oldsmobile Cutlass Supreme (W platform)	For 1982, Oldsmobile began to phase in the front-wheel drive Cutlass Ciera as the successor of its four-door Cutlass Supreme line, as it retired its lower-trim Cutlass and Cutlass LS sedans; Oldsmobile marketed the Cutlass Supreme and Cutlass Supreme Brougham on the G platform. The two-door Cutlass Supreme range saw fewer changes, continuing its namesake version alongside the luxury Brougham and touring-oriented Calais and Salon trims. As a muscle car, Oldsmobile introduced the limited-edition Hurst/Olds for 1983 and 1984, replacing it with a revived Oldsmobile 442 for 1985. For 1988 (produced through December 1987), the Cutlass Supreme Classic was produced, offered only as a two-door coupe. At the beginning of 1988, the Cutlass Supreme adopted the GM10/W platform, introducing a four-door sedan for 1990.
Oldsmobile Cutlass Cruiser	1982–1983	5-door station wagon	Oldsmobile Cutlass Cruiser (A platform RWD)	Oldsmobile Cutlass Cruiser (A platform FWD)	The Cutlass Cruiser nameplate was introduced for 1978, applied to its midsize wagons with and without wood-paneled exterior trim. For 1984, Oldsmobile shifted the Cutlass Cruiser from the G platform to the A platform, giving the name to the Cutlass Ciera station wagon.
Pontiac Bonneville Pontiac Grand LeMans	1982–1986 (Bonneville) 1982–1983 (Grand LeMans)	4-door sedan; 5-door station wagon (1982-1983)	Pontiac LeMans	Pontiac Bonneville (H platform)	For 1982, Pontiac retired the LeMans name in the United States, with the Grand LeMans marketed in Canada for 1983. The model line was replaced by the front-wheel drive 6000, but Pontiac marketed a G platform sedan as the body of the LeMans was given a minor facelift and repackaged as the Bonneville for 1982. In downsizing the model line from the B platform to the G platform, the Bonneville became the 4-door sedan counterpart of the Grand Prix, with a 5-door station wagon offered through 1983 (replaced by a 6000 station wagon for 1984). For 1987, Pontiac shifted the Bonneville to the front-wheel drive H platform.
Pontiac Grand Prix	1982–1987	2-door coupe	Pontiac Grand Prix (A platform)	Pontiac Grand Prix (W platform)	For its redesignation on the G platform, the Pontiac Grand Prix saw no major changes - with the exception of the Bonneville replacing the LeMans as its four-door counterpart. In contrast to other "G-Special" coupes, the Grand Prix was not offered with a high-performance variant. For 1986, the Grand Prix 2+2 (see below) was introduced with an aerodynamically-enhanced exterior to homologate the model line for stock car racing.

== Performance applications ==
General Motors G platform vehicles were some of the last cars to follow the traditional muscle car formula (intermediate-size, rear-wheel drive coupe with powerful V8 engine), remaining popular as the mid-size segment was shifting towards front-wheel drive. Buick, Chevrolet, and Oldsmobile each sold a significant performance variant of their model line, including the Buick Regal Grand National, Chevrolet Monte Carlo SS, and Oldsmobile 442.

Model name	Years produced	Powertrain	Notes
Buick Regal Sport Coupe Buick Regal T-Type/Turbo T Buick Regal Grand National	1982 (Sport Coupe); 1983-1986 (T-Type); 1987 (Turbo T); 1982, 1984-1987 (Grand National)	3.8 L (231 cu in) turbocharged V6: 1982 (4-bbl): 175 hp; 1983: 180 hp; 1984–1985 (SFI): 200 hp; 1986: 235 hp; 1987: 245 hp	Buick introduced the turbocharged V6 for the Regal Sport Coupe in 1978 (serving as the replacement for the 455 V8), with a 175 hp 4-barrel version offered in 1982. The Regal Sport Coupe was last offered in 1982, with the Grand National developed as a limited-edition option package commemorating Buick's stock-car racing success; of the 215 produced for 1982, fewer than 50 were fitted with the turbocharged engine from the Sports Coupe. For 1983, the Regal Sport Coupe was replaced with the Regal T-Type. Along with the turbocharged V6, the T-Type also included upgraded suspension, brakes, and steering, alloy wheels, and blackout trim; the interior was fitted with bucket seats and a console-mounted shifter. After skipping 1983, the Regal Grand National was made a regular-production option package for 1984. Along with the chassis and interior upgrades of the T-Type, the turbocharged V6 was made standard. In contrast with the T-Type, the Grand National was produced with an all-black exterior (with no Regal badging nor a hood ornament). For 1987, Buick replaced the T-Type trim with the stand-alone "Turbo T" option package, offering the chassis upgrades and exterior revisions separate from the turbocharged V6 (and from each other). As the Regal shifted to the W platform, the T-Type and Grand National were retired as Buick revived the Gran Sport variant for the model line.
Buick GNX	1987	3.8 L (231 cu in) turbocharged V6 276 hp	For 1987, the limited-production Buick GNX (Grand National Experimental) was introduced as the ultimate evolution of the G platform, developed in a collaboration between Buick, McLaren Performance Technologies, and ASC; in total, 547 examples were produced. The 3.8 L V6 (officially rated at 276 hp) was fitted with an upgraded turbocharger and larger intercooler along with suspension upgrades to optimize traction during high-speed acceleration (along with larger wheels and tires). While sharing the same all-black exterior as the Grand National, the GNX was fitted with black alloy wheels, functional fender vents, and large fender flares. In testing, the Buick GNX rivaled the later Chevrolet Corvette ZR-1 and Dodge Viper RT/10 in acceleration, achieving 0–60 in 4.7 seconds and the quarter-mile in 13.5 seconds (at 102 MPH).
Chevrolet El Camino SS GMC Caballero Diablo	1982-1987	5.0 L (305 cu in) V8	Sharing powertrain commonality with the Monte Carlo SS, the El Camino SS shared the bodywork of the standard El Camino (derived from the 1982-1983 Malibu station wagon), distinguished by two-tone graphics and Super Sport decals. GMC marketed its equivalent as the Caballero Diablo. From 1983 to 1987, the El Camino SS was available with the front aerodynamic bodywork of the Monte Carlo SS (and its aluminum wheels) as a dealer-installed conversion.
Chevrolet Monte Carlo SS	1983-1987 1986-1987 (Aerocoupe)	5.0 L (305 cu in) "HO" V8 1983: 175 hp 1984-1987: 180 hp	For 1983, Chevrolet reintroduced the Monte Carlo SS (last produced in 1971) as a sportier variant of the model line. Optimized as the Chevrolet entry for stock-car racing, Chevrolet redesigned the front fascia of the car and marketed it with body skirting and a decklid spoiler. In contrast to the standard coupe, the Monte Carlo SS was entirely devoid of chrome trim. For 1986, the Monte Carlo Aerocoupe was introduced as a variant to homologate a redesigned roofline for NASCAR racing. In place of the formal notchback roofline, the Aerocoupe was designed with a wraparound glass rear window (requiring a redesign of the trunklid). After 200 were built in 1986, the Aerocoupe became a full-scale option for the Monte Carlo SS for 1987. As Chevrolet introduced the Lumina coupe, the role of the Monte Carlo SS was passed to the Lumina Z34, its entry for stock-car racing. On the W platform, the Monte Carlo SS nameplate made its return for 2000.
Oldsmobile Hurst/Olds	1983–1984	5.0 L (307 cu in) "HO" V8 180hp	The 1983 Hurst/Olds was introduced to commemorate the 15th anniversary of its 1968 namesake; Hurst also used the car to debut the 3-stick Lightning Rod shifter. Along with a high-output 307 V8, the Hurst/Olds was externally fitted with a power-bulge hood and a decklid spoiler. 1983 cars are painted black with a silver lower body; 1984 cars are painted silver with black lower body (both versions have red pinstriping). For 1985, Oldsmobile replaced the Hurst/Olds with a revived 442.
Oldsmobile 442	1985–1987	5.0 L (307 cu in) "HO" V8 1985: 180 hp 1986–1987: 170 hp	After a four-year hiatus, the 442 made its return to the Cutlass Supreme line for 1985. Based on the touring-oriented Cutlass Salon, the 442 was nearly identical to the Hurst/Olds (using a conventional console shifter). Officially designated the W42 option package, the 442 included the high-output 5.0L V8, upgraded suspension, brakes, steering, and tires; the interior was fitted with front bucket seats, full instrumentation, and a console-mounted shifter. For 1987, the 442 retained its design, but became aligned with the standard-trim Cutlass Supreme. After going on hiatus, the 442 nameplate returned for 1990 as part of the Cutlass Calais line, denoting its highest-performance model line.
Pontiac Grand Prix 2+2	1986	5.0 L (305 cu in) V8 165 hp	Though the luxury-oriented Pontiac Grand Prix was not offered with a high-performance variant like its divisional counterparts, the aerodynamically-enhanced Grand Prix 2+2 was developed for 1986 to homologate a sleeker body for NASCAR racing. Offered as a limited-production vehicle alongside the Grand Prix LE and Grand Prix Brougham, Pontiac redesigned the front fascia and rear roofline; to further modernize the appearance, the 2+2 was styled without chrome trim and fitted with body-color bumpers. To improve the aerodynamics of the Grand Prix body for stock-car racing, the front fascia was styled in a fashion similar to Monte Carlo SS, integrating the front bumper and grille (though mounted lower and raked further back than on its Chevrolet counterpart). As with the Monte Carlo SS Aerocoupe, the rear roofline of the Grand Prix 2+2 was fitted with a wraparound rear window (extending nearly to the decklid spoiler). The only 1986 Grand Prix sold with a standard V8 engine, Pontiac sold 1,118 examples of the Grand Prix 2+2. The W-platform Grand Prix would adopt part of the design of the 2+2 front fascia, featuring its split grille below the line of the bumper.

=== Use in motorsport ===
The G platform coupes were among the last vehicles (alongside the Fox and MN12-platform Ford Thunderbird) derived fully from production vehicles. After the 1988 retirement of the G platform, NASCAR regulations continued to stipulate production body parts until 2003 (namely, the hood, roof, and deck lid). During this period, most of the vehicles in stock-car racing were derived from vehicles that had a transverse front-wheel drive layout (especially as the Ford Taurus replaced the Thunderbird for 1998), so the drivetrain and all running gear were either custom-built or sourced from other (usually, older) models.

== See also ==
- General Motors G platform (FWD)
- General Motors A platform (RWD)
