= Full-size car =

Vehicle size class

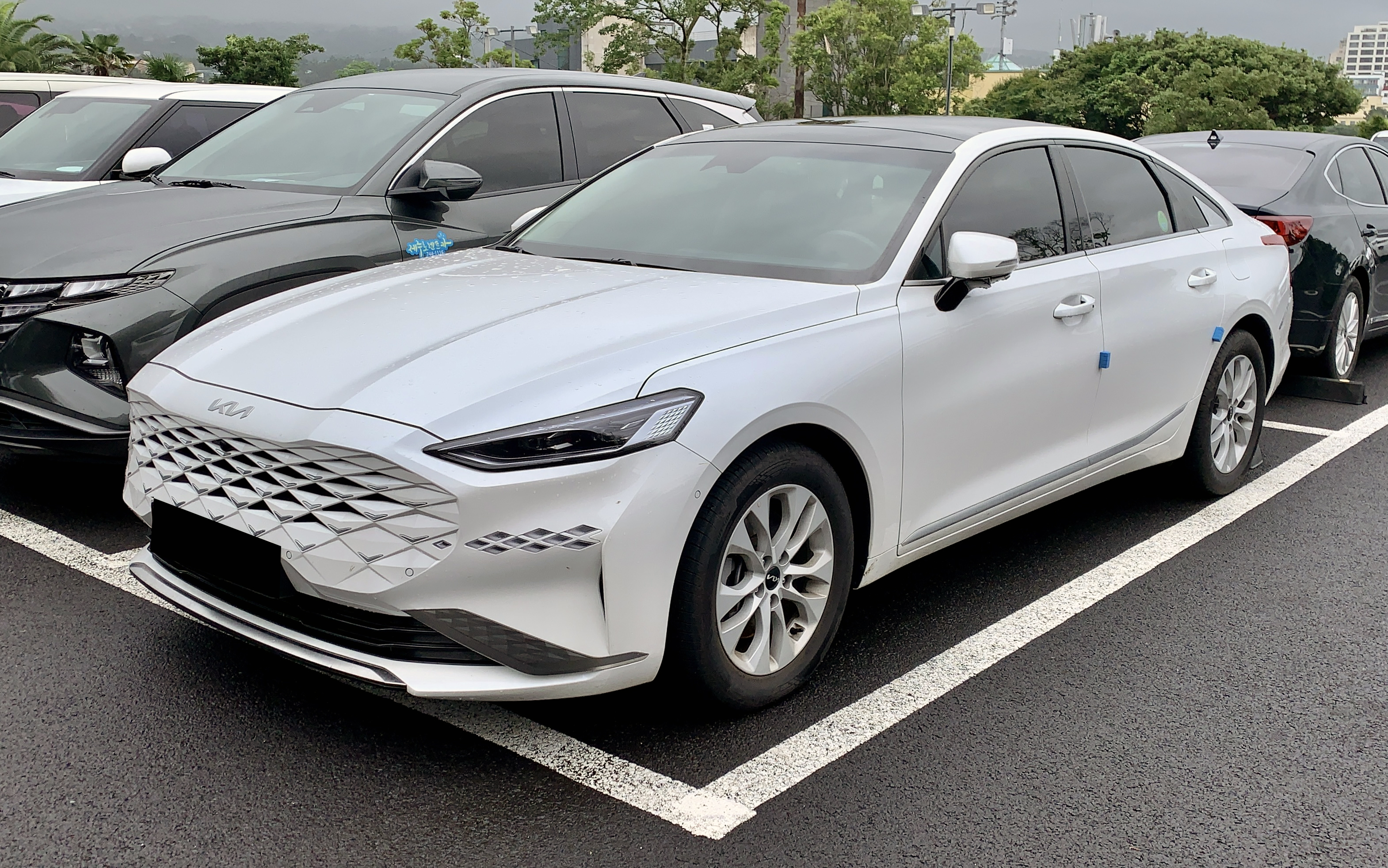
2022 Kia K8

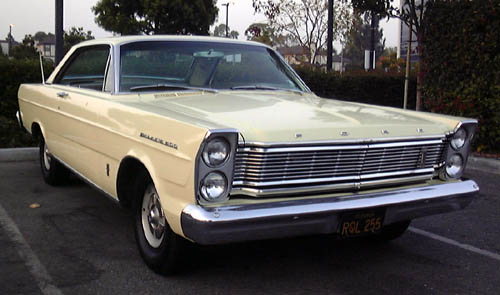
1965-1968 Ford Galaxie LTD

Full-size car, also known as large car, is a vehicle size class which originated in the United States and is used for cars larger than mid-size cars. It is the largest size class for cars. In the United Kingdom, this class is referred to as the executive car, while in Europe, it is known as E-segment or F-segment.

== Current definition ==
The United States Environmental Protection Agency (EPA) Fuel Economy Regulations for 1977 and Later Model Year (dated July 1996) includes definitions for classes of automobiles. Based on the combined passenger and cargo volume, large cars (full-size cars) are defined as having an interior volume index of more than 120 cu ft (3.4 m^{3}) for sedan models, or 160 cu ft (4.5 m^{3}) for station wagons.

== Engines ==
From the introduction of the Ford Flathead V8 in the 1930s until the 1980s, most North American full-size cars were powered by V8 engines. However, V6 engines and straight-six engines have also been available on most American full-size cars, especially until the 1950s, and have become increasingly common since the downsizing of full-sized cars in the 1980s.

== History ==
=== Early 20th century ===
The lineage of mass-produced full-size American cars begins with the 1908 Ford Model T. In 1923, General Motors introduced the Chevrolet Superior, becoming the first vehicle to adopt a common chassis (the A-body) for several brands. Compared to the cars of the 21st century, these vehicles are small in length and width.

From the 1920s to the 1950s, most manufacturers produced model lines in a single size, growing in size with each model redesign. While the length and wheelbase varied between model lines, width was a relatively constant dimension, as the American federal government required the addition of clearance lights on a width past 80 inches.

=== 1960s ===
In 1960, following the introduction of compact cars (such as the Chevrolet Corvair, Ford Falcon and Plymouth Valiant), the "full-size car" designation came into wider use. In the 1960s, the term was applied to the traditional car lines of lower-price brands, including Chevrolet, Ford, and Plymouth. As a relative term, full-size cars were marketed by the same brands offering compact cars, with entry-level cars for buyers seeking the roominess of a luxury car at a lower cost. Into the 1970s, the same vehicles could transport up to six occupants comfortably (or eight in a station wagon), at the expense of high fuel consumption.

=== 1970s ===
The sales of full-size vehicles in the United States declined after the early 1970s fuel crisis. In response to the 1978 implementation of CAFE, American manufacturers implemented downsizing to improve fuel economy, with full-size vehicles as the first model lines to see major change.

While General Motors and Ford would reduce the exterior footprint of their full-size lines to that of their intermediates, AMC withdrew its Ambassador and Matador full-size lines (to concentrate on production of mid-size vehicles). To save production costs, Chrysler repackaged its intermediates using the erstwhile full-size names, moving on to exiting the segment in 1981.

=== 1980s ===
During the 1980s, manufacturers further reduced the exterior footprint of several model lines from the full-size segment into the mid-size class to comply with more stringent CAFE standards. With the 1982 model year, Chrysler exited the full-size segment entirely, with the mid-size Dodge Diplomat and Plymouth Gran Fury serving as its largest sedan lines.

Following the 1985 model year, General Motors replaced most of its full-size rear-wheel-drive model lines with smaller front-wheel drive sedans on the H and C platforms. Only station wagons, the Chevrolet Caprice, and the Cadillac Brougham remained. Initially developed to replace the Ford LTD Crown Victoria, the 1986 Ford Taurus was produced alongside it as the Ford mid-size model line.

After largely abandoning the full-size segment for compact cars and minivans, Chrysler gained reentry into the full-size segment in 1988 with the Eagle Premier (also produced as the Dodge Monaco). Developed by AMC before its acquisition by Chrysler, the Premier was a version of the front-wheel drive Renault 25 adapted for North America. The Saab 9000 took a special position at the end of the 1980s, as for a long time it was the only imported car to be classified as a "large car" by the EPA.

=== 1990s ===
From the 1980s to the 1990s, the market share of full-size cars began to decline as mid-size cars, vans, and SUVs grew in use as family vehicles. Between 1960 and 1994, the market share of full-size cars declined from 65 to only 8.3 percent. From 1990 until 1992, both GM and Ford redesigned its full-size car lines for the first time since the late 1970s.

For the 1992 model year, Chrysler introduced a new front-wheel drive full-size car line, replacing the Eagle Premier/Dodge Monaco with the Chrysler LH cars (Dodge Intrepid, Eagle Vision, Chrysler Concorde/New Yorker/LHS). The same year, the Buick Roadmaster was introduced, becoming the first rear-wheel drive GM model line adopted outside of Chevrolet and Cadillac since 1985; the Chevrolet Impala was returned for the 1994 model year.

The 1989 Lexus LS400 luxury sedan was the first Japanese full-size car sold in North America.

Following the 1996 model year, GM ended production of large rear-wheel drive sedans.

=== 2000s ===
By 2000, with the sole exception of the Ford Crown Victoria, Mercury Grand Marquis, and Lincoln Town Car, full-size cars had abandoned rear-wheel drive and body-on-frame construction. Instead of model lineage, the EPA "large car" definition of over 120 interior cubic feet was widely used.

Initially developed for the midsize Oldsmobile Aurora, the GM G-body chassis was expanded into the full-size segment for Cadillac in 2000 (for the Deville, later the DTS) and adapted by Buick (the Lucerne) in 2006. For the 2005 model year, Chrysler replaced the LH cars with the LX cars (returning to rear-wheel drive). The same year, Ford introduced the Five Hundred, its first front-wheel drive full-size car (the first American full-size car offered with all-wheel drive); in 2008, the Five Hundred was renamed the Taurus.

=== 2010s ===
After the 2011 model year, Ford ended production of the Panther platform, shifting to the Ford Taurus and Lincoln MKS; in 2017, the latter was replaced by the Lincoln Continental. In 2011, General Motors ended production of the G-body for several chassis (with Cadillac later shifting its largest sedans to rear-wheel drive). In 2012, the Tesla Model S became the first fully electric full-size car sold in North America. For the 2013 model year, the Chevrolet Impala became the final American-market full-size sedan sold with a front bench seat.

By the mid-2010s, full-size cars began seeing a steep decline in sales in North America, with SUVs replacing much of the full-size segment. At the end of the decade, demand for sedans (of all sizes) shifted towards vehicles of other layouts and production of sedans became increasingly unprofitable for American car manufacturers, forcing them to reduce or shutter production of sedans entirely. In 2018, Ford announced the sales of all Ford-branded passenger cars (except for the Mustang) would end in North America by 2022. General Motors announced the closure of several manufacturing facilities in the United States and Canada, with the production of the Chevrolet Impala and Buick LaCrosse ending in 2020. As of 2022, full-size cars from Asian manufacturers include the Lexus LS, Genesis G80/G90, Nissan Maxima, and Toyota Avalon. Another car from an Asian manufacturer, the eighth-generation Hyundai Sonata, is classified by the EPA as full-size despite being marketed as a mid-size model.

In 2018, the three highest-selling cars in the full-size sedan category in the United States were the Dodge Charger, Chevrolet Impala, and Chrysler 300.

=== 2020s ===
The large car segment has been declining in the United States accounting for 3.6% of new vehicle sales in 2021, down from 6.6% in 2016. The models in this category included the Chrysler 300, Dodge Charger, Nissan Maxima, and Toyota Avalon. They have been discontinued after the 2023 or 2024 model years. The trend in the large car market segment in United States is toward the SUV.

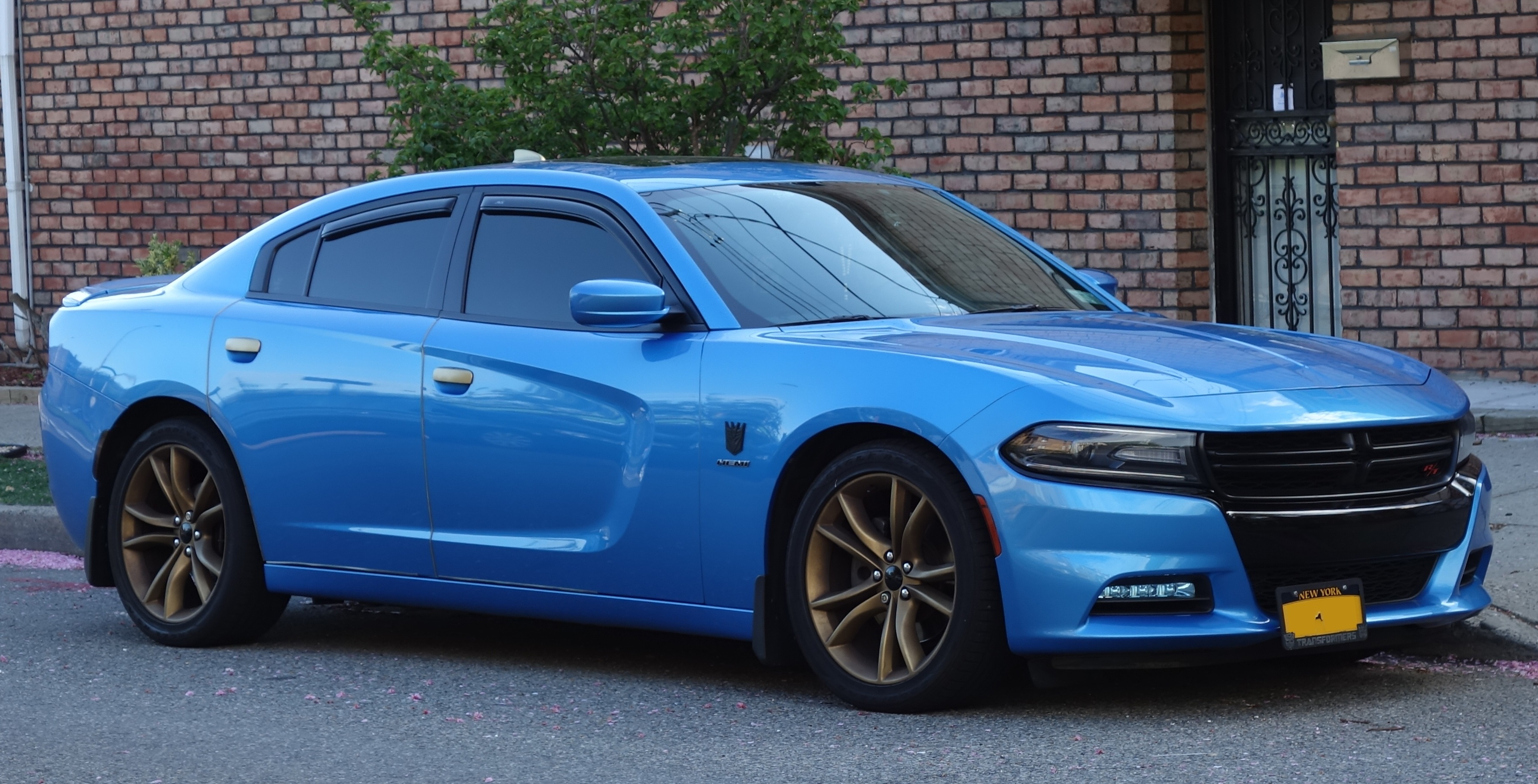
Dodge Charger
(2015–2023 model shown)

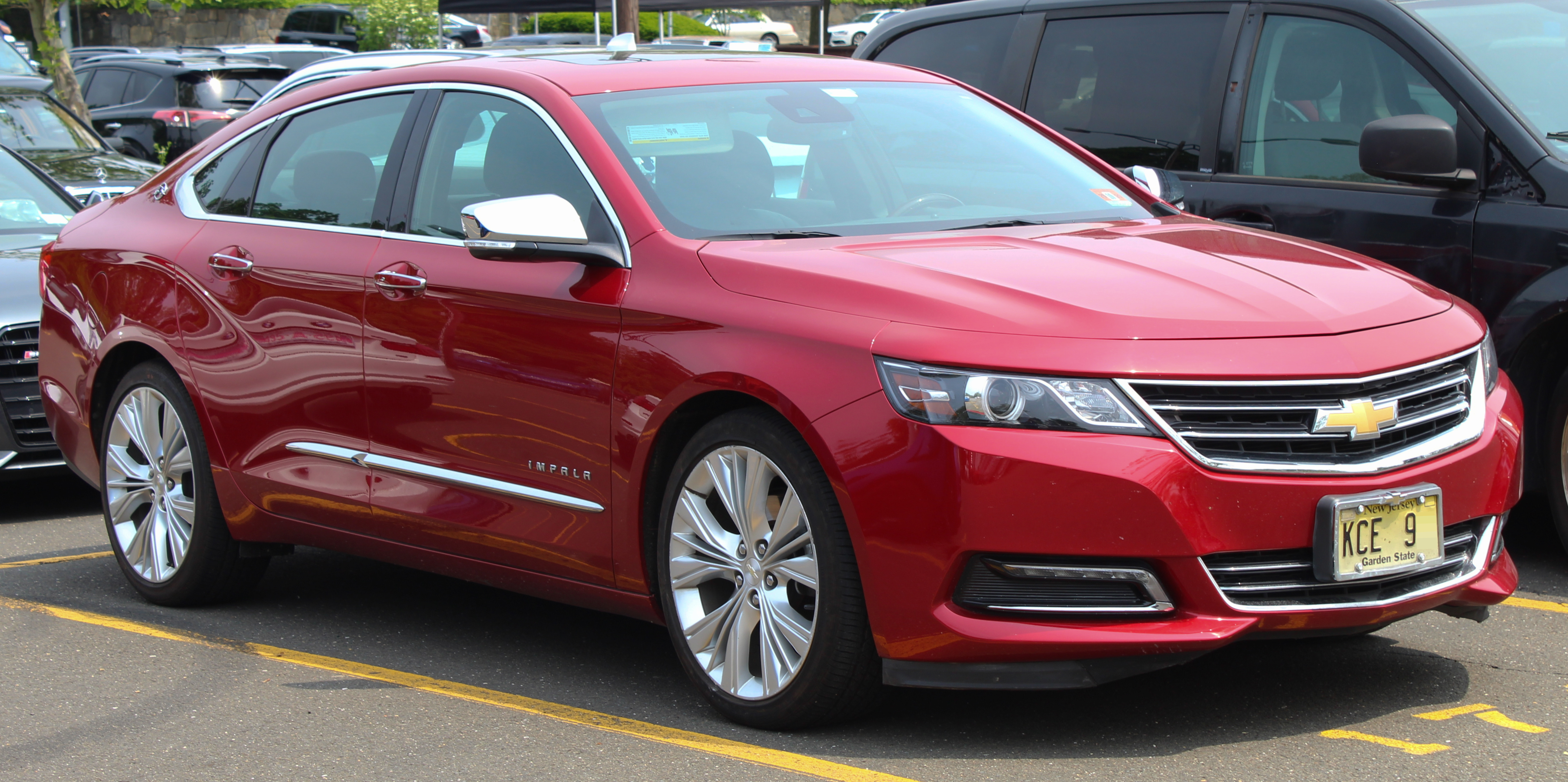
Chevrolet Impala
(2014–2020 model shown)

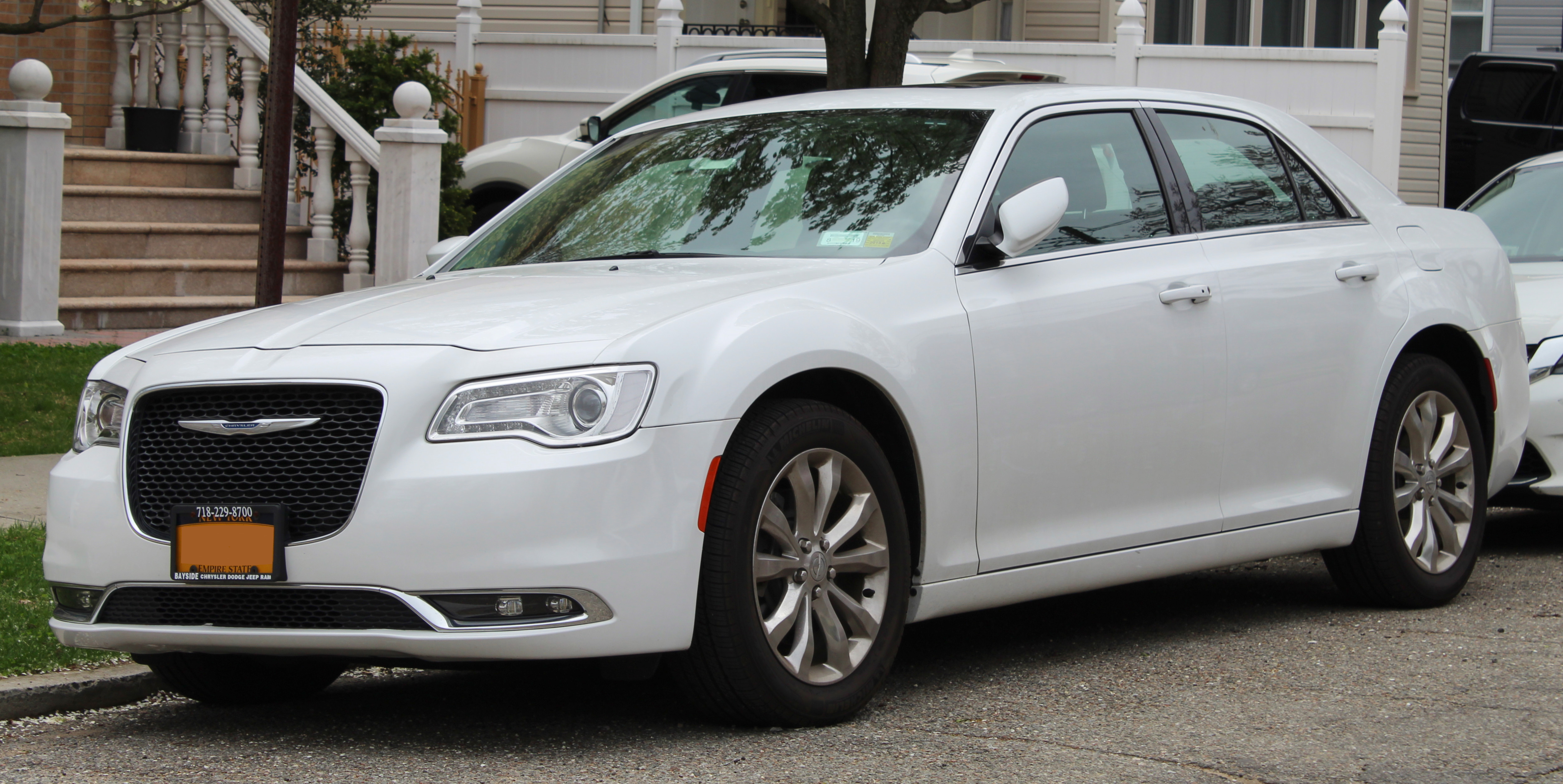
Chrysler 300
(2015–2023 model shown)

== See also ==
- Car classification
- Vehicle size class
- Executive car and E-segment - equivalent terms for a full-size car in the United Kingdom and European Union
- F-segment
