= Intrigue =

Intrigue may refer to:

== TV and film ==
- Intrigue (1920 film), a 1920 German silent drama film
- Intrigue (1942 film), a Spanish film
- Intrigue (1947 film), 1947 film directed by Edwin L. Marin
- The Intrigue, 1916 silent film drama
- "Intrigue" (Revenge), sixth episode of the American television series Revenge

== Music ==
- Intrigue (band) (formed in 1989) is a Sámi heavy metal band from Norway.
- The Intrigues, soul trio from Philadelphia, Pennsylvania

== Other uses ==
- Intrigue (solitaire), card game
- Intrigue!, a video game
- The Oldsmobile Intrigue, a model of automobile
- The USS Intrigue (AM-253), a minesweeper built for the U.S. Navy during World War II

== See also ==
- Cloak and dagger in Popular culture
- Cabalism
- Obscurantism, blurring the lines between groups, suggesting vague points of agreement between topics or assumptions
- Politainment
- Halloween, intrigue is used in haunted attractions such as haunted houses and halloween theme park rides
- Roasting, comedic jabs and parodies or satire that features intrigue building
- Intriguer, a 2010 album by Crowded House
