= Intriguer (disambiguation) =

Intriguer is a 2010 album by Crowded House.

Intriguer may also refer to:

- The Intriguers, a 1972 novel by Matt Helm novel

== See also ==
- Intrigue (disambiguation)
