= Northstar engine series =

Family of high performance 90° V engines produced by General Motors

Northstar engine
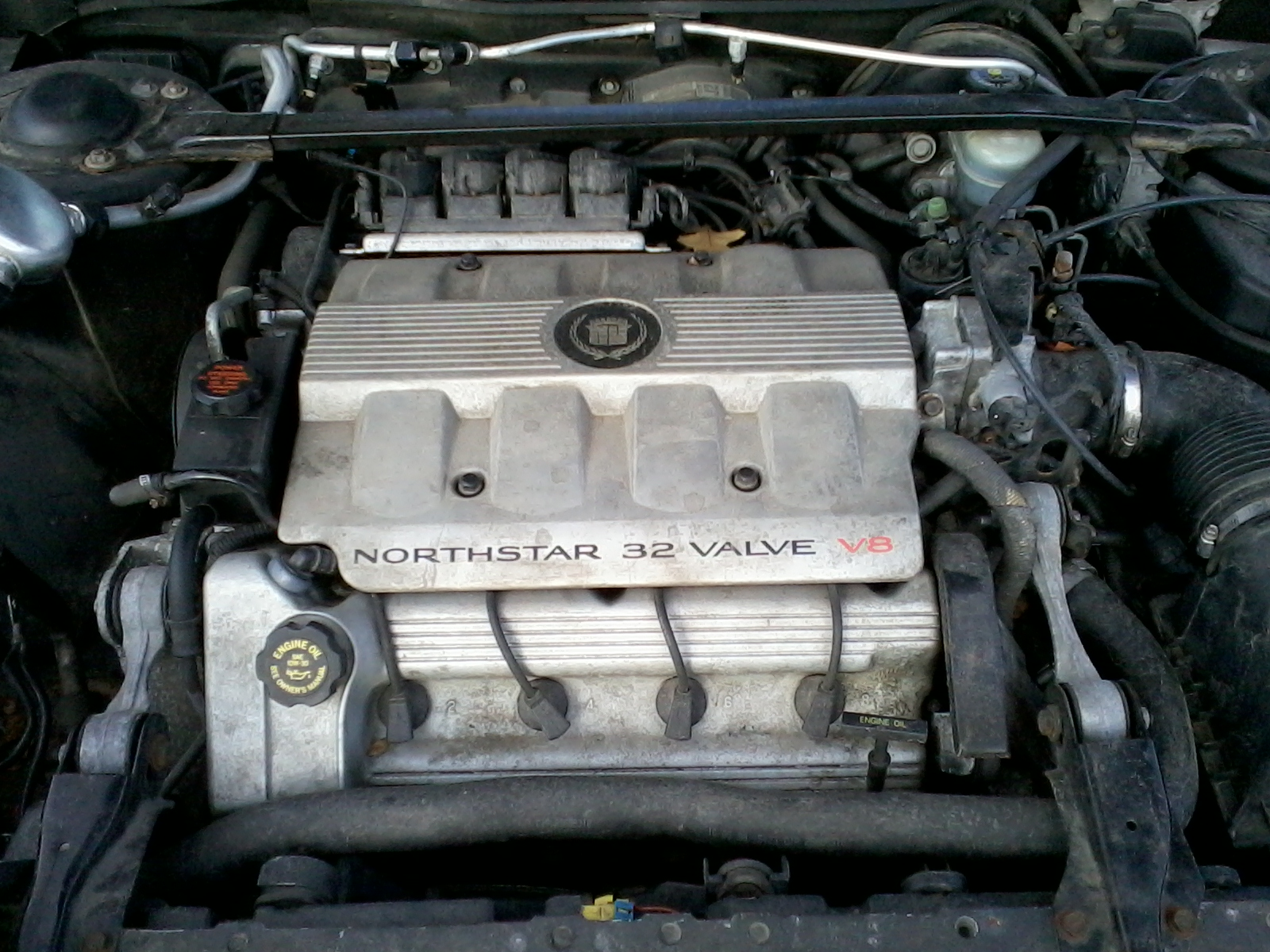
- 1993–1999 4.6 L Northstar engine

Overview
- Manufacturer: General Motors
- Also called: Cadillac Northstar; Premium engine
- Production: 1992–2011

Layout
- Configuration: 90° V8/V6
- Displacement: 3.5 L (3,473 cc; 211.9 cu in); 4.0 L (3,995 cc; 243.8 cu in); 4.4 L (4,371 cc; 266.7 cu in); 4.6 L (4,565 cc; 278.6 cu in)
- Cylinder bore: 87 mm (3.43 in); 89.5 mm (3.52 in); 91 mm (3.58 in); 93 mm (3.66 in)
- Piston stroke: 84 mm (3.31 in); 92 mm (3.62 in)
- Cylinder block material: Aluminum
- Cylinder head material: Aluminum
- Valvetrain: DOHC 4 valves x cyl. (with VVT on some variants)
- Compression ratio: 9.0:1, 9.3:1, 10.0:1, 10.3:1, 10.5:1

Combustion
- Supercharger: In 4.4 L versions
- Turbocharger: Twin-turbo in 2000 Northstar LMP program only
- Fuel system: AC Rochester Sequential FI
- Fuel type: Gasoline
- Cooling system: Water-cooled

Output
- Power output: 215–469 hp (160–350 kW)
- Torque output: 234–439 lb⋅ft (317–595 N⋅m)

Chronology
- Predecessor: Cadillac High Technology engine (V8)
- Successor: Cadillac twin-turbo V8

The Northstar engine is a family of high-performance 90° V engines produced by General Motors between 1993 and 2011. Regarded as GM's most technically complex engine, the original double overhead cam, four valve per cylinder, aluminum block/aluminum head V8 design was developed by Oldsmobile R&D, but is most associated with Cadillac's Northstar series.

Displacing 4.6 L (4,565 cc; 278.6 cu in) in its basic form, the direct family line transitioned to longitudinal and 4.4 L (4,371 cc; 266.7 cu in) supercharged versions. Variants were used at Oldsmobile (as the Aurora L47 V8 and "Shortstar" LX5 V6), as well as in several top-end 2000s Pontiacs and Buicks.

The related Northstar System was Cadillac's trademarked name for a package of performance features introduced in mid-1992 that coupled the 4T80E transmission, a 100,000 mile service interval, road sensing suspension, variable power steering, and 4-wheel disc brakes to the Division's high-output and high-torque Northstar engines.

GM ceased production of the Northstar in 2011. The final cars to receive it, the Cadillac DTS, Buick Lucerne, and Cadillac STS, rolled off the line in 2011. It was replaced by the GM LS small-block OHV engine, used in newer Cadillac V8 models like the CTS-V, marking a step back to a simpler, more reliable pushrod engine design. These LS V8 engines were the only V8 engines used by Cadillac for the next eight years, until the clean sheet Blackwing V8 was introduced in 2018 in the 2019 Cadillac CT6-V. A Cadillac-exclusive, it was discontinued after just two years in early 2020.

== Development and features ==
GM initiated what ultimately became the Northstar's design at Oldsmobile R&D some time in 1984 in anticipation of the advanced dual overhead cam V8 engines to be introduced by European and Japanese competitors later in the decade. At that time, Cadillac was using the aluminum HT Overhead Valve (OHV) V8 which GM pushed hastily into production because the CAFE standards for 1982 would preempt using 1981's V8-6-4. At the time it was GM's corporate policy not to pass the gas guzzler tax on to the consumer.

Cadillac was developing new models which they hoped would compete against the best luxury cars from BMW, Mercedes-Benz, and Asian rivals like Lexus, Acura, and Infiniti. GM developed a laundry list of items to be included in the Allanté and updated Eldorado and Seville STS, including sophisticated steering, braking, and suspension technologies, and an engine exclusive to "Cadillac" the Division's dealers were clamoring for. This group of features became known as the Northstar System. Central to it was a high-tech V8 with the performance and sophistication to compete with an ever-expanding list of imported challengers.

Capable of producing 300 hp (224 kW) out of its 4.6 L (4,565 cc; 278.6 cu in) displacement, the Northstar featured a cast aluminum 90° V8 block with 4 in (101.6 mm) bore spacing split into unitary upper and lower halves. The lower crankcase assembly supported the crankshaft without conventional main bearing caps. An oil manifold plate with an integrated silicone gasket forms the oil gallery under this. A typical oil change used 7.5–8 US qt (7.1–7.6 L; 6.2–6.7 imp qt) of oil.

GM specified cast-iron cylinder liners and the cast aluminum pistons included valve clearance. Northstar is an interference engine: the valves will strike the pistons if they lose timing. It has bronze piston pin bushings and free-floating piston pins. GM used cast aluminum cylinder heads featuring 4 valves per cylinder. The heads used dual overhead cams driven through the "maintenance-free" cam-drive chain case. The cams act directly on hydraulic lifters on the ends of the valves and are fed with a lubrication passage drilled through the cylinder head lengthwise. The intake valves are inclined at 25°, while the exhaust valves are canted to 7° with center-mounted platinum-tipped spark plugs. The cam covers are magnesium for light weight and sound damping.

Sequential fuel injection was delivered via eight thermoplastic tubes. Ignition was distributorless, with a waste spark setup. The powertrain control module (PCM) controlled spark and fuel injection timing as well as the shift points for the new four-speed, transverse GM 4T80 transmission. All engines of this family share the same Northstar bellhousing pattern.

One notable feature advertised at the time was the "limp home" fail-safe mode, which allowed the engine to continue running for a limited time without any coolant. Supplying fuel to only one cylinder bank in turn, the engine would "air cool" the inactive bank. This technique, combined with its all-aluminum construction and large oil capacity, allows the engine to maintain safe temperatures, allowing a Northstar-equipped car to be driven with no coolant for about 100 mi (161 km) without damage. Another unusual feature of some heavily electronic-laden Northstar-equipped cars such as the Seville, DeVille, and Eldorado is a liquid-cooled alternator. Although this was intended to prolong alternator life, GM reverted to a traditional air-cooled setup for 2001 to eliminate potential leak points and extraneous tubing.

Later developments included direct coil-on-plug ignition, roller lifters, and variable valve timing, which can vary intake by up to 40° and the exhaust by up to 50°. VVT was devised for the longitudinal LH2 version, and was not used on the transverse front wheel drive engines due to packaging considerations.

== Northstar series ==
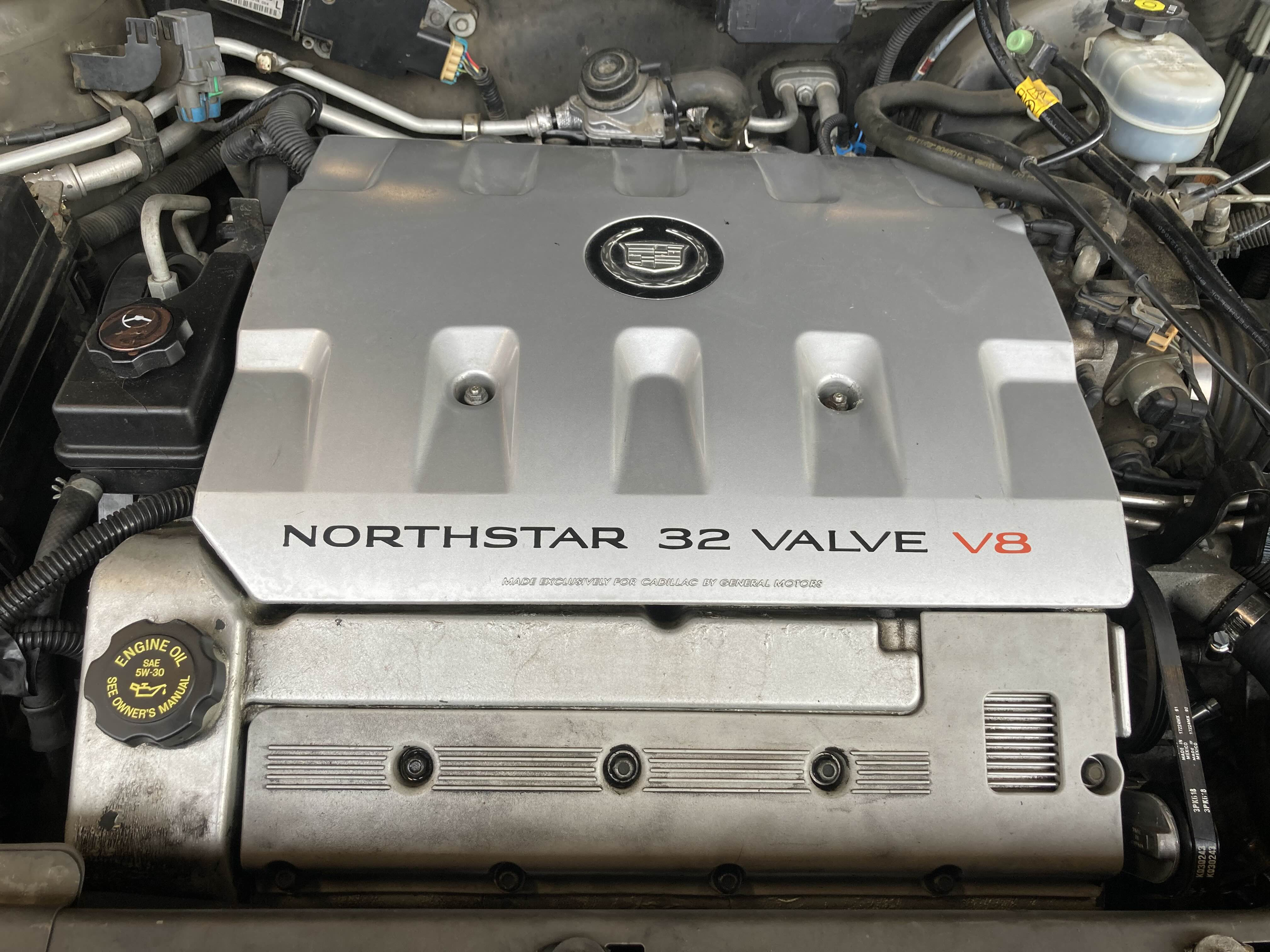
A 2000–2003 Northstar engine from a Cadillac Seville.

The engine was introduced in mid-1992 in the 1993 Cadillac Allanté; in 1996 the Northstar became the standard engine on all Cadillacs except the Fleetwood, but was phased out of all Cadillac models by 2011. The 275 hp (205 kW) Northstar engine was used on all Northstar equipped Cadillacs while the Deville Concours, Eldorado ETC, Seville STS, and in 2000 the Deville DTS, were fitted with the 300 hp (224 kW) version. The original Northstar Allanté also introduced the Northstar System which included traction control, adaptive suspension, and anti-lock brakes. Early Northstars required premium grade gasoline to maximize performance.

The Northstar was sold exclusively by that name by Cadillac for over a decade before being introduced in the 2004–2005 Pontiac Bonneville and 2006 Buick Lucerne. However, the 4.0 L (3,995 cc; 243.8 cu in) L47 V8 Northstar variant was used in the Oldsmobile Aurora the 3.5L LX5 V6 in the Oldsmobile Intrigue and Oldsmobile Shelby Series 1. The LH2 engine variant received a forged steel crankshaft in October 2003. The LD8 and L37 variants received a forged crankshaft for the 2006 model year. Cadillac had planned to introduce a V12 Northstar this decade, likely for use in the Escalade, but economics and new CAFE standards killed the idea.

Most Northstar engines produce 275 to 300 hp (205 to 224 kW), with power reaching as high as 469 hp (350 kW) in the supercharged LC3. The engines were revised for model year 2000 with coil-on-plug ignition and roller follower valvegear for improved fuel economy and reduced emissions. Though power output did not change, this update made premium fuel merely recommended, rather than required.

All but the supercharged Northstars displaced 4.6 L (4,565 cc; 278.6 cu in) with a 93 mm × 84 mm (3.66 in × 3.31 in) bore and stroke. To allow for better head gasket sealing between cylinders, the supercharged version was de-bored to 91 mm (3.58 in) for a total displacement of 4.4 L (4,371 cc; 266.7 cu in). The block is believed to be capable of expansion up to 5.4 L, though no such engine has been produced.

The Northstar was on the Ward's 10 Best Engines list for 1995, 1996, and 1997.

The 4.6-liter V8 engine found in models from 1995–2005 were notorious for failure due to a design flaw involving the use of torque-to-yield bolts in the head gasket. Essentially, these types of bolts are stretched beyond their elasticity upon installation, ultimately increasing wear and fatigue on the bolt and decreasing its service life. The high load of the engine would eventually cause these bolts to weaken and loosen in their threads, rupturing the seal and in turn blowing the head gasket.

=== Northstar System ===
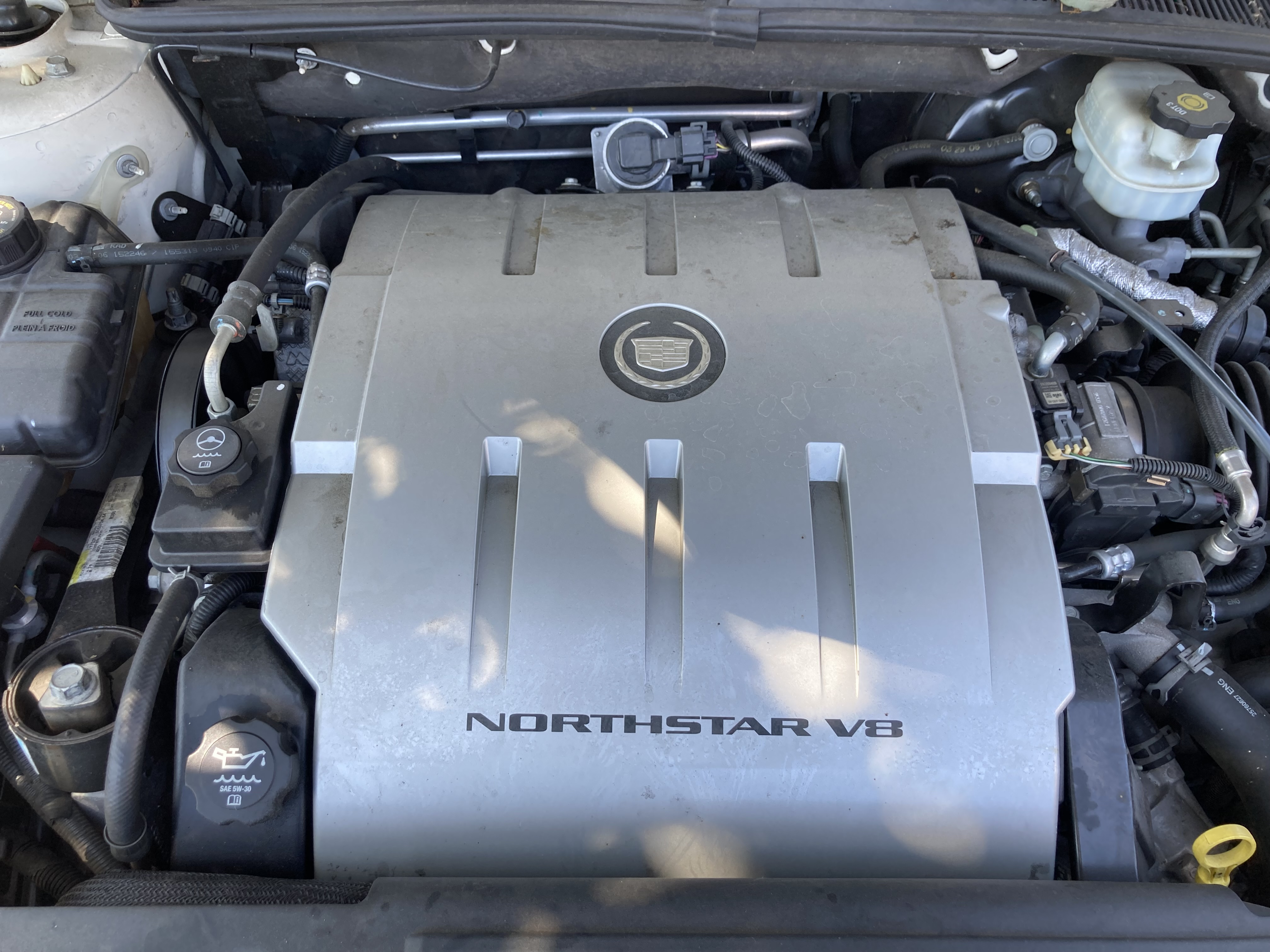
A 2004–2011 Northstar engine from a Cadillac DTS.

The Northstar System was Cadillac's trademarked name for a package of automobile performance features introduced in mid-1992 on the 1993 Cadillac Allanté and later on the 1993 Seville and Eldorado.

The Northstar System included the following components:

- L37 high-output 300 hp (224 kW) and 295 lb⋅ft (400 N⋅m)
- LD8 high-torque 275 hp (205 kW) and 300 lb⋅ft (407 N⋅m)
- Variable valve timing (VVT), a continuously variable system throughout the rpm range, increasing fuel economy.

GM engines use the double overhead cam, varying both intake and exhaust for better performance.

- GM 4T80-E 4-speed automatic transmission
- Road Sensing Suspension (RSS), which monitored damping rates of the shock absorbers every 15 milliseconds, selecting between two settings.

RSS was available in both standard and CV-RSS (continuously-variable) systems.

- 4-wheel disc brakes with Bosch anti-lock brakes
- Magnasteer speed-variable power steering, which combines conventional hydraulic power steering and magnetized "doughnuts" mounted around the output shaft, which stiffen the steering as vehicle speed increases.

Later versions of the Northstar engine included the 4.6L 320 hp (239 kW) and 315 lb⋅ft (427 N⋅m) LH2 which began in 2004, and supercharged 4.4L 469 hp (350 kW) LC3 created for the STS-V which are detailed below.

=== L37 ===
The 4.6 L (4,565 cc; 278.6 cu in) L37 (VIN "9") was the original Northstar. It is tuned for responsiveness and power, while the later LD8 is designed for more sedate use. The L37 code had been used on all high-output transverse Northstars, even as the exact engine specifications evolved. The compression ratio for the L37 is 10.3:1 for engines built prior to 2000, and 10.0:1 afterwards.

The original L37 was specified at 290 hp (216 kW), but 1993 production examples were rated at 295 hp (220 kW). The engine topped out at 300 hp (224 kW) from 1996 through 2004 on the STS, DTS and ETC models, making these some of the most powerful domestic front wheel drive cars ever built. For 2005 the L37 was named "Northstar NHP", and was downrated to 290 hp (216 kW) under the new SAE certified horsepower rating system. In 2006, the updated DTS "Performance Package" model got a slight bump to 292 hp (218 kW). Vehicles using the L37 include:

Year	Model	Power	Torque
1993	Cadillac Allanté	295 hp (220 kW) at 5600 rpm	290 lb⋅ft (393 N⋅m) at 4400 rpm
1993–1994	Cadillac Eldorado ETC	295 hp (220 kW) at 5600 rpm	290 lb⋅ft (393 N⋅m) at 4400 rpm
1995–2002	Cadillac Eldorado ETC	300 hp (224 kW) at 6000 rpm	295 lb⋅ft (400 N⋅m) at 4400 rpm
1993–1994	Cadillac Seville STS	295 hp (220 kW) at 5600 rpm	290 lb⋅ft (393 N⋅m) at 4400 rpm
1995–2004	Cadillac Seville STS	300 hp (224 kW) at 6000 rpm	295 lb⋅ft (400 N⋅m) at 4400 rpm
1996–2004	Cadillac DeVille Concours/DTS	300 hp (224 kW) at 6000 rpm	295 lb⋅ft (400 N⋅m) at 4400 rpm
2005	Cadillac DeVille DTS	290 hp (216 kW) at 5600 rpm	285 lb⋅ft (386 N⋅m) at 4400 rpm
2006–2011	Cadillac DTS Performance/Platinum	292 hp (218 kW) at 6300 rpm	288 lb⋅ft (390 N⋅m) at 4500 rpm
2008–2011	Buick Lucerne Super	292 hp (218 kW) at 6300 rpm	288 lb⋅ft (390 N⋅m) at 4500 rpm

=== LD8 ===
The 4.6 L (4,565 cc; 278.6 cu in) LD8 (VIN "Y") is a transverse V8 for front-wheel drive cars. Introduced in 1994, it is designed to provide more torque than the high-revving L37. The LD8 code had been used on all torque-tuned transverse Northstars, even as the exact engine specifications evolved. Compression ratio is 10.3:1 for engines built prior to model year 2000, and 10.0:1 for those built afterwards. The 1998 revision is quieter than previous Northstar engines, due to hydraulic engine mounts, and performs better due to a tuned intake system.

Most LD8 Northstars are rated at 275 hp (205 kW) and 300 lb⋅ft (407 N⋅m).

Year	Model	Power	Torque
1994	Cadillac Eldorado	270 hp (201 kW)	300 lb⋅ft (407 N⋅m)
1995–2001	Cadillac Eldorado ESC	275 hp (205 kW) at 5750 rpm	300 lb⋅ft (407 N⋅m)
2002	Cadillac Eldorado ESC	275 hp (205 kW) at 5600 rpm	300 lb⋅ft (407 N⋅m) at 4000 rpm
1993–1994	Cadillac Seville SLS	270 hp (201 kW)	300 lb⋅ft (407 N⋅m)
1995–2004	Cadillac Seville SLS	275 hp (205 kW) at 5600 rpm	300 lb⋅ft (407 N⋅m) at 4000 rpm
1994	Cadillac DeVille Concours	270 hp (201 kW)	300 lb⋅ft (407 N⋅m)
1995	Cadillac DeVille Concours	275 hp (205 kW) at 5750 rpm	300 lb⋅ft (407 N⋅m)
1996–2001	Cadillac DeVille	275 hp (205 kW) at 5750 rpm	300 lb⋅ft (407 N⋅m) at 4000 rpm
2002–2005	Cadillac DeVille	275 hp (205 kW) at 5600 rpm	300 lb⋅ft (407 N⋅m) at 4000 rpm
2006–2011	Cadillac DTS	275 hp (205 kW) at 6000 rpm	295 lb⋅ft (400 N⋅m) at 4400 rpm
2004–2005	Pontiac Bonneville GXP	275 hp (205 kW) at 5600 rpm	300 lb⋅ft (407 N⋅m) at 4000 rpm
2006–2007	Buick Lucerne CXL (optional)/CXS	275 hp (205 kW) at 6000 rpm	295 lb⋅ft (400 N⋅m) at 4400 rpm

=== LH2 (VIN "A") ===
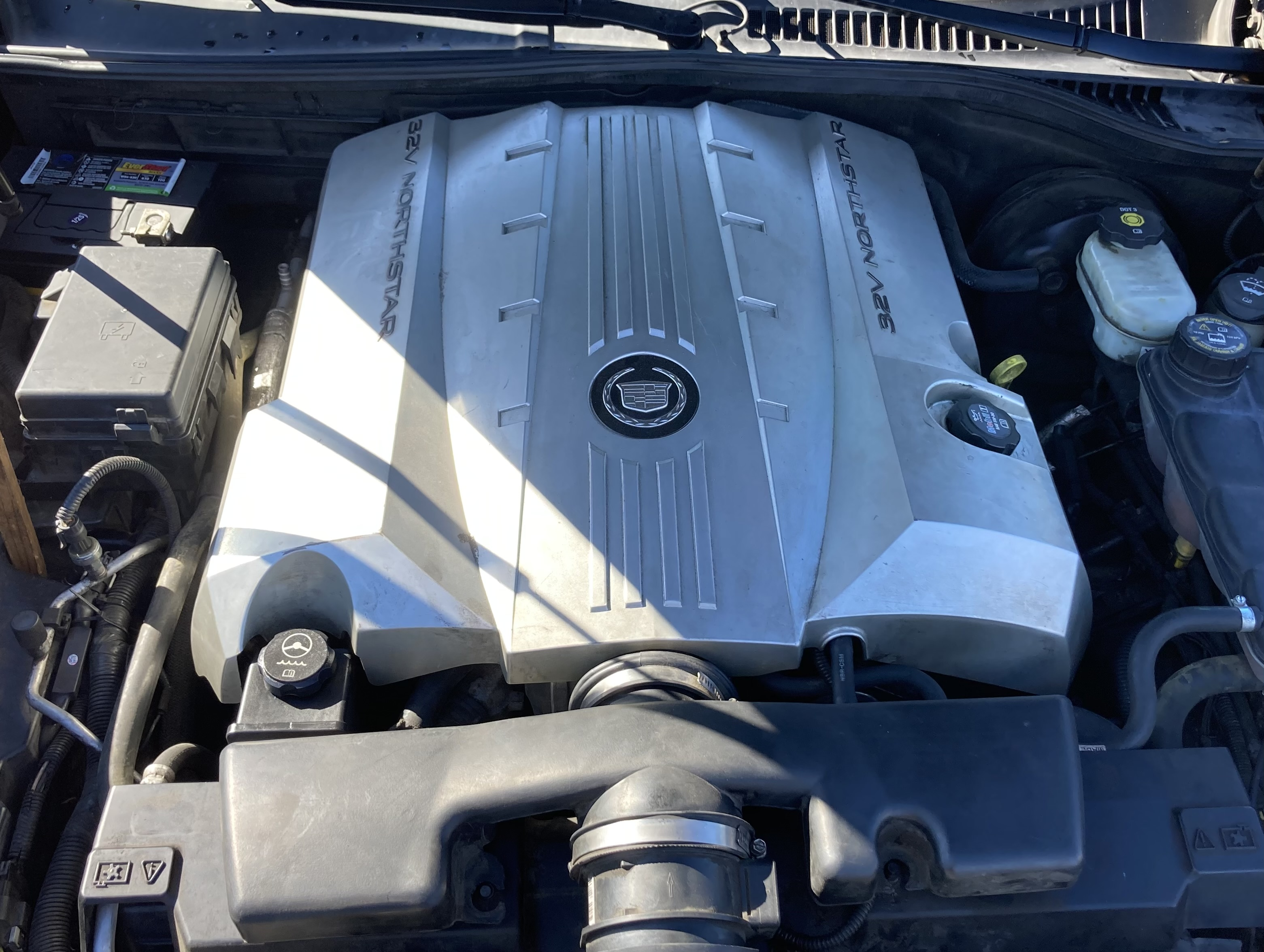
An LH2 Northstar V8 from a Cadillac XLR.

The 4.6 L (4,565 cc; 278.6 cu in) Northstar was designed originally for transverse front-wheel drive applications. It was modified substantially in 2004 for longitudinal rear- and all-wheel drive use in the STS, SRX, and XLR, as well as receiving continuously variable valve timing on both intake and exhaust sides. The RWD (LH2) Northstar produces 320 hp (239 kW) and 315 lb⋅ft (427 N⋅m). The addition of variable valve timing enables most of the increase in power from the L37 and LD8 Northstars.

Year	Model	Power	Torque
2004–2009	Cadillac SRX	320 hp (239 kW) at 6400 rpm	315 lb⋅ft (427 N⋅m) at 4400 rpm
2004–2009	Cadillac XLR	320 hp (239 kW) at 6400 rpm	310 lb⋅ft (420 N⋅m) at 4400 rpm
2005–2010	Cadillac STS	320 hp (239 kW) at 6400 rpm	315 lb⋅ft (427 N⋅m) at 4400 rpm
2007–2009	Cadillac SLS (China)	320 hp (239 kW) at 6400 rpm	315 lb⋅ft (427 N⋅m) at 4400 rpm

=== LC3 ===
A 4.4 L (4,371 cc; 266.7 cu in) supercharged Northstar was used in the 2006 Cadillac STS-V and Cadillac XLR-V. The bore was reduced for increased strength and improved head gasket sealing. Variable valve timing is used on both the intake and exhaust sides. The STS-V engine produces 469 hp (350 kW) at 6400 rpm and 439 lb⋅ft (595 N⋅m) at 3900 rpm with 9.0:1 compression and the XLR-V engine produces 443 hp (330 kW) at 6400 rpm and 414 lb⋅ft (561 N⋅m) at 3900 rpm.

Year	Model	Power	Torque
2006–2009	Cadillac STS-V	469 hp (350 kW) at 6400 rpm	439 lb⋅ft (595 N⋅m) at 3900 rpm
2006–2009	Cadillac XLR-V	443 hp (330 kW) at 6400 rpm	414 lb⋅ft (561 N⋅m) at 3900 rpm

=== L47 ===
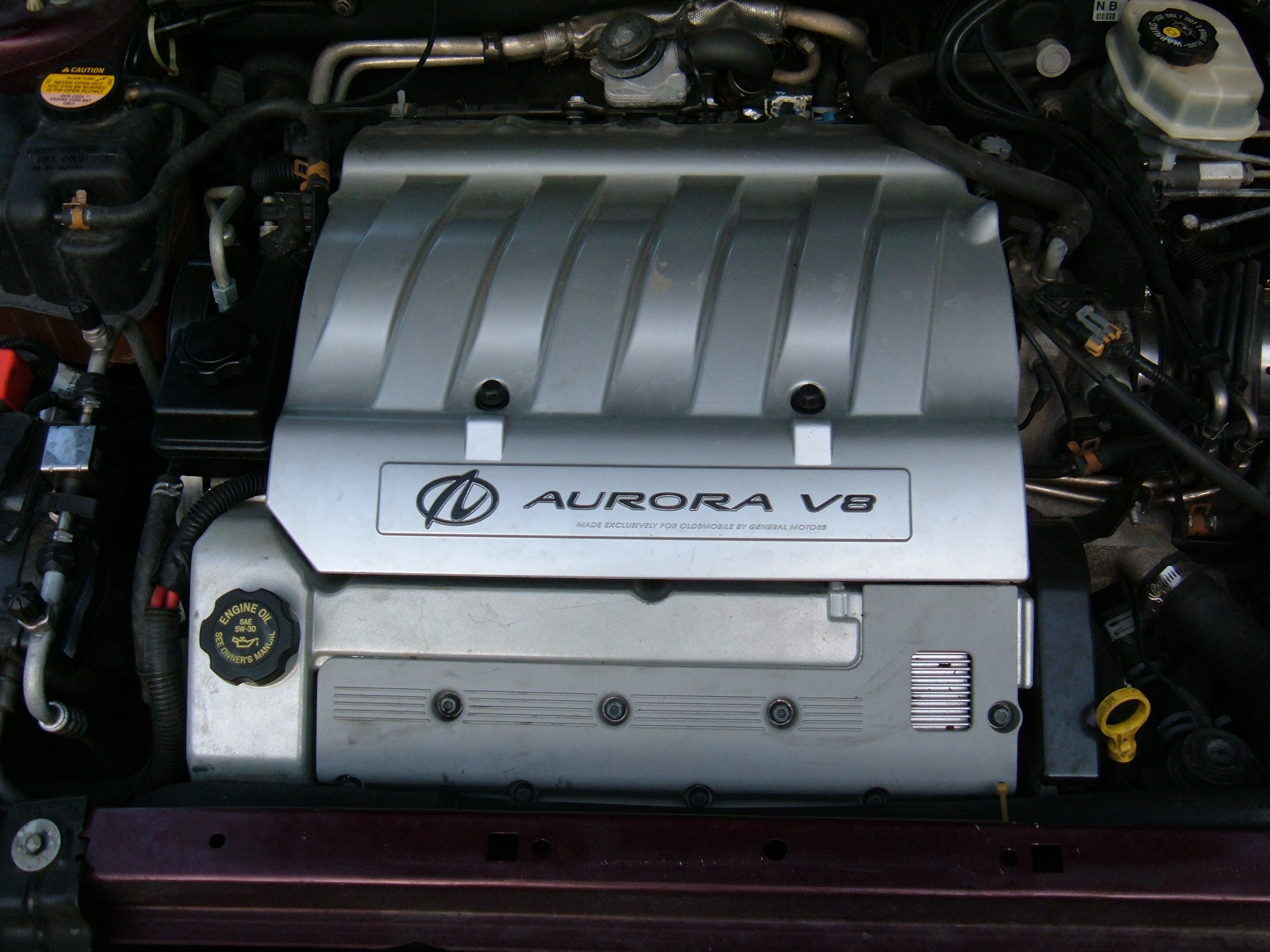
An L47 inside an Aurora's engine bay

The L47 Aurora engine was a special V8 designed for the Oldsmobile Aurora, based on the Northstar engine, used during the 1995–1999 and 2001–2003 model years. It is a DOHC 4.0 L (3,995 cc; 243.8 cu in) V8 which produced 250 hp (186 kW) and 260 lb⋅ft (353 N⋅m) of torque. The bore and stroke was 87 mm × 84 mm (3.43 in × 3.31 in). The L47 had a 10.3:1 compression ratio and used premium fuel.

Although most of the Northstar's features, including the coolant loss system, remained intact, the decreased bore increased weight unacceptably. To reduce it, Oldsmobile used a one-piece glass-filled thermoplastic intake manifold and simplified AC Rochester sequential fuel injection. A new die-cast structural aluminum oil pan incorporated baffling to reduce oil starvation in hard driving. A starter interlock prevented the starter from engaging if the quiet L47 was already running.

An early version or prototype of this engine was used in the 2nd generation Oldsmobile Aerotech. A highly modified 650 hp (485 kW) version of this engine was used by General Motors racing division initially for IMSA sports car competition in an Oldsmobile Aurora GTS-1 and Riley&Scott LMP prototypes in 1995, Indy Racing League competition starting in 1997, then was later used in the Cadillac Northstar LMP program in 2000. Both engines retained the 4.0 L displacement, but the Northstar LMP version was twin-turbocharged. The Aurora was also used in the Shelby Series 1 car. In the inaugural DTM season, Opel would debut their Opel Astra DTM with a V8 derived from the L47.

The Aurora engine was introduced in 1994 for the 1995 model year, and General Motors has not used this engine since the retirement of Oldsmobile in 2004.

Year	Model	Power	Torque
1995–2003	Oldsmobile Aurora	250 hp (186 kW) at 5600 rpm	260 lb⋅ft (353 N⋅m) at 4400 rpm
1999–2005	Shelby Series 1	320 hp (239 kW) at 6500 rpm	290 lb⋅ft (393 N⋅m) at 5000 rpm

== LX5 ==
The LX5 is a DOHC V6 from Oldsmobile, introduced in 1999 with the Intrigue. It was produced by the Premium V engine group at GM and was thus called the Premium V6, or PV6, while it was being developed. It is based on the L47 Aurora V8, which is itself based on the Northstar engine. An early proposal for its name was Proton, and Shortstar was used briefly by some on the team, but in the end it was referred to in-house as the PV6, though Oldsmobile fans have taken to calling it the Shortstar.

Although it has a 90° V-angle like the Northstar, the engine block was engineered from scratch, so bore centers are different. It has chain-driven dual overhead cams and four valves per cylinder, but is an even-firing design with a split-pin crankshaft similar to the Buick 3800 engine. The LX5 displaced 3.5 L (3,473 cc; 211.9 cu in) and produced 215 hp (160 kW) at 5,600 rpm and 234 lb⋅ft (317 N⋅m) at 4,400 rpm. Bore and stroke is 89.5 mm × 92 mm (3.52 in × 3.62 in). It was also one of GM's first engines to use coil-on-plug ignition. Compression ratio is 9.3:1.

The cost of building this engine was high, and it was only used in the Intrigue and second generation Aurora. It was said at the time that a family of premium V6s would follow, with displacements ranging from 3.3 L to 3.7 L, but only the LX5 was ever produced before GM discontinued the Shortstar in favor of their current flagship V6, the High Feature engine, in 2004.

The LX5 was entirely different from any other V6 in the GM inventory—the only other DOHC V6 engines ever offered by GM included the Chevrolet Twin Dual Cam produced from 1991–1997, which was made by modifying the traditional Chevy 60-degree OHV block V6 for the dual overhead cams rather than building a DOHC engine from the ground up, and the Cadillac/Holden HFV6 available from 2004 to the present day. These three designs are completely unrelated and leave two gaps in 1998 and 2003 where no DOHC V6 was available from GM (except for the 54 degree Opel V6 used most notably in the first generation Cadillac CTS at launch as well as the Saturn L Series and Catera). This contrasts starkly with competitors practices of evolving engineering over multiple, continuously improving designs. As with the Aurora V8, production stopped with the demise of Oldsmobile.

Year	Model	Power	Torque
1999–2002	Oldsmobile Intrigue	215 hp (160 kW) at 5600 rpm	234 lb⋅ft (317 N⋅m) at 4400 rpm
2001–2002	Oldsmobile Aurora	215 hp (160 kW) at 5600 rpm	234 lb⋅ft (317 N⋅m) at 4400 rpm

The 3.5L LX5 was on the Ward's 10 Best Engines list for 1999 and 2000.
