= GM 4T80 transmission =

4T80-E
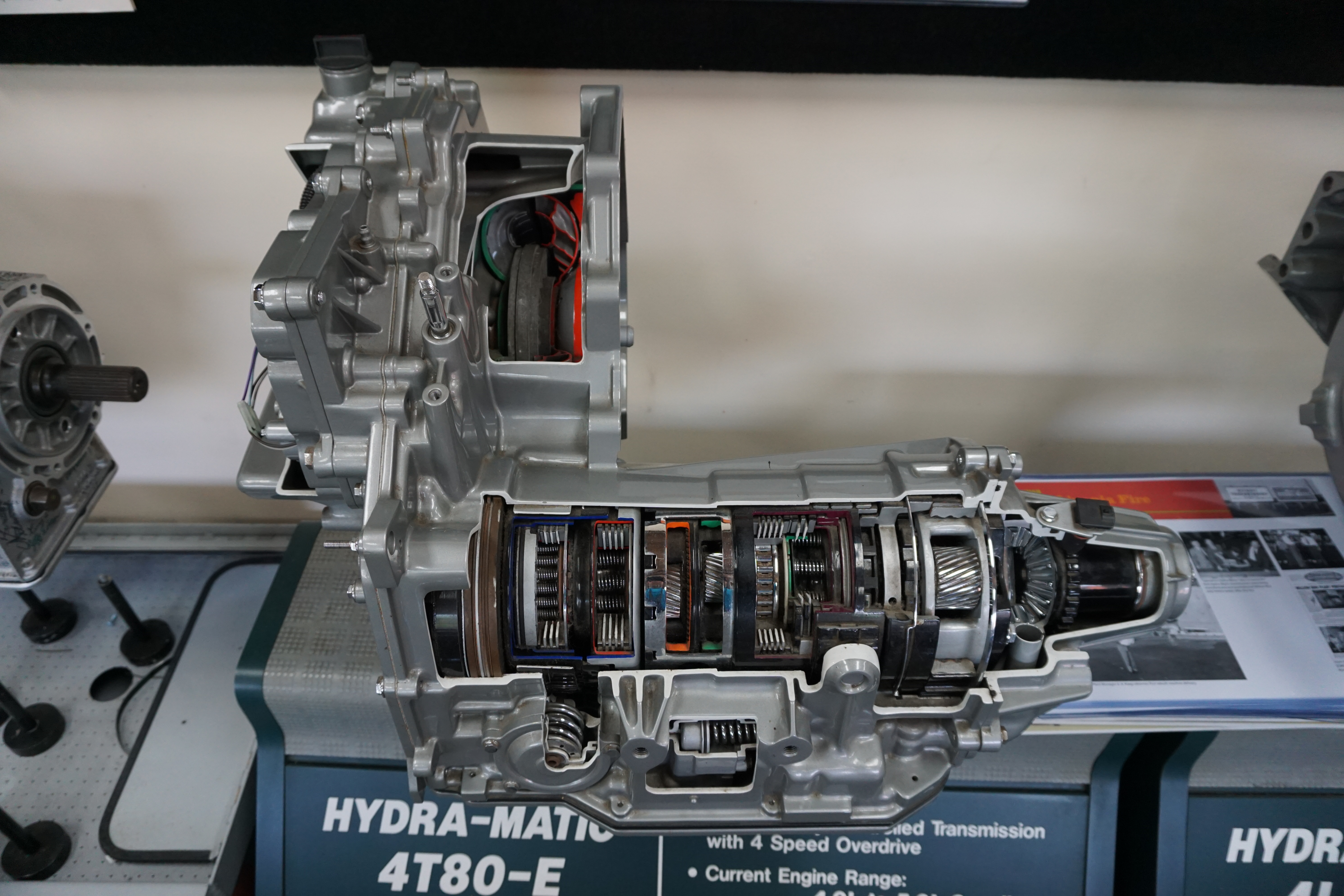
- A Hydra-Matic 4T80 transmission at the Ypsilanti Automotive Heritage Museum

Overview
- Manufacturer: General Motors
- Production: 1993–2011

Body and chassis
- Class: 4-speed transverse automatic transmission

Chronology
- Predecessor: Turbo-Hydramatic 125
- Successor: 6T70

The 4T80E is a series of front wheel drive fully automatic transmissions from General Motors. Designed for transverse engine configurations, the series includes 4 gear bearing overdrive 2 electronic shift solenoids, and electronic force motor to control line pressure.

The 4Txx family is an evolution of the original Turbo-Hydramatic 125 transverse automatic introduced in the 1980 model year "X" body.

The 4T80-E transmission is electronically controlled and features an automatic overdrive transaxle with an electronically controlled torque converter clutch. The 4T80 originally used a viscous clutch, but this was changed in 2005 to ECCC.

The 4T80 is built at Willow Run Transmission in Ypsilanti, Michigan.

== 4T80-E ==
The "MH1" 4T80-E is able to handle vehicles up to 8000 lb (3628.74 kg) GVWR. The final drive ratio is 3.11:1, 3.48:1, or 3.71:1. (39:39 sprocket teeth )

The 4T80 uses a viscous torque converter clutch, which was replaced with EC3 (electronically controlled converter clutch) in 2005.

Transmission broadcast codes in 2005 for the ECCC transmission are 5ABN and 5MMN.

The 4T80-E is a hydramatic transmission and was developed for use with V8 front-wheel-drive cars, and at the time exclusively the Cadillac Northstar engine.

It was designed with extreme power handling capabilities at the time. The 4T80-E debuted in the Cadillac Allanté in 1993 along with the Northstar Double Overhead Camshaft (DOHC) V8. It reportedly cost 80% more than a similar GM 4T60 transmission and weighed 60 lb (27 kg) more.

This transaxle has been used in many of GM's front drive large sedans. The Cadillac Division had exclusive usage of the 4T80-E until the 1995 Oldsmobile Aurora debuted.

The Aurora had the 4.0L version of the Northstar V8 coupled to a 4T80-E. It wasn't until 2004 that Pontiac got usage of this transaxle in the Bonneville GXP which employed a 275 horsepower version of the Northstar 4.6L V8.

The 4T80-E was last used in 2011 on the Cadillac DTS and the Buick Lucerne (when equipped with the 4.6L Northstar).

Gear ratios:

1	2	3	4	R				
2.96	1.626	1.00	0.681	2.13	Final Drive Ratio	3.11	3.48	3.71

Applications:

- 3.11:1
  - 1994–2005 Cadillac Deville
  - 1993-2002 Cadillac Eldorado
  - 1993-2004 Cadillac Seville
  - 2006 Cadillac DTS
- 3.48:1
  - 1995-1999 Oldsmobile Aurora
- 3.71:1
  - 1996–2005 Cadillac Deville Concours/DTS
  - 1993-2002 Cadillac Eldorado ETC
  - 1993-2004 Cadillac Seville STS
  - 1995-1999 Oldsmobile Aurora Autobahn package
  - 2004–2005 Pontiac Bonneville GXP
  - 2006-2011 Buick Lucerne V8
  - 2001-2003 Oldsmobile Aurora V8
  - 2007-2011 Cadillac DTS

== See also ==
- List of GM transmissions
