= Oldsmobile Aurora =

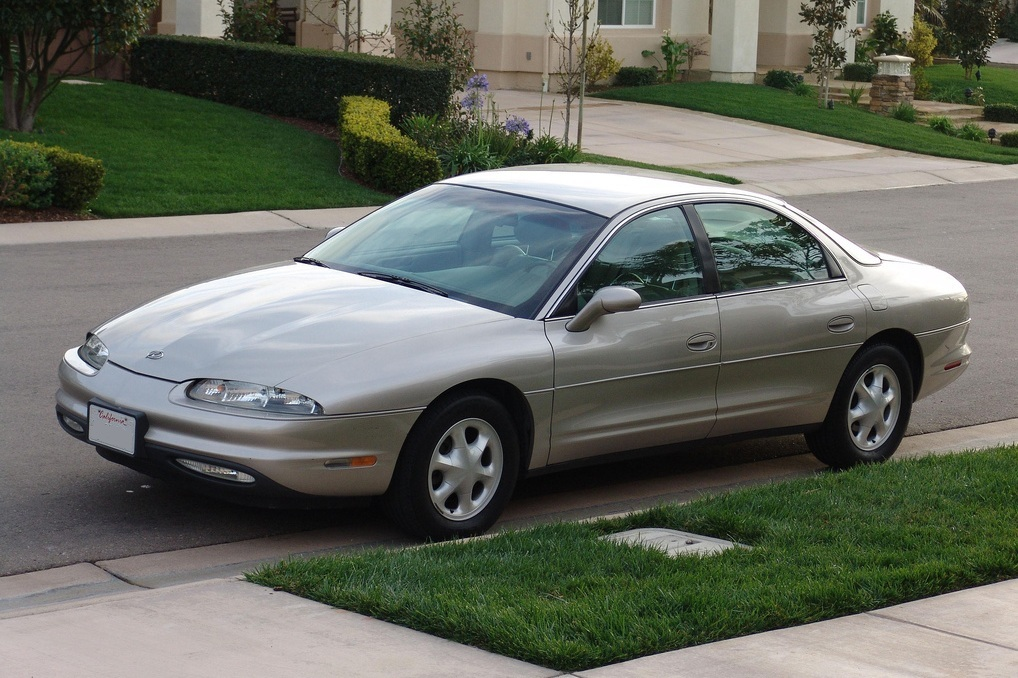
- 1997 Oldsmobile Aurora

Overview
- Manufacturer: Oldsmobile (General Motors)
- Production: January 24, 1994 – June 25, 1999; November 1, 1999 – March 28, 2003
- Model years: 1995–1999; 2001–2003
- Assembly: United States: Orion Township, Michigan (Orion Assembly)

Body and chassis
- Class: Full-size luxury car
- Body style: 4-door sedan
- Layout: Transverse front-engine, front-wheel drive

Chronology
- Predecessor: Oldsmobile 98; Oldsmobile 88

The Oldsmobile Aurora is a luxury sedan, manufactured and marketed by General Motors from 1994 until 2003 over two generations — sharing platforms with Buick Riviera and using the Cadillac-derived G platform. At the time of production, the Aurora was the flagship vehicle in the Oldsmobile lineup, having originated from the 1989 Oldsmobile tube concept.

The Aurora replaced the Toronado coupe and eventually the Oldsmobile 98, LSS and Regency in the Oldsmobile range — using V8 and V6 engines. It was equipped with a four-speed automatic transmission.

== Origins ==
Design work on what would become the Aurora began as early as the late 1980s with the 1989 Oldsmobile Tube Car engineering concept. Designed by Bud Chandler, the concept served as a preview of key Aurora design elements, including a full-width taillamp, wraparound rear windshield, and frameless windows. Unlike the production car, the Tube Car used a pillarless hardtop design with suicide doors. The final production design was approved in July 1989, originally set for 1992 production.

By the Aurora's introduction, Oldsmobile sales had fallen from a record high of 1,066,122 in 1985 to 402,936 in 1993; rumors of the division's demise were rampant, which GM at the time firmly denied. Competition from Acura, Infiniti and Lexus offered similar products with better reputations for durability and reliability; Oldsmobile also suffered from models that some claimed looked too similar to other vehicles in the General Motors portfolio. While this had been partially rectified with the final generation of 98, 88, and Cutlass Supreme models, an advertising campaign using the controversial slogan "not your father's Oldsmobile" further alienated many loyal buyers and customers. GM developed the Aurora to rejuvenate Oldsmobile as a result.

The Aurora bore no Oldsmobile badging save for the radio-CD-cassette deck and engine cover, as focus groups were turned off on learning the car would be marketed as an Oldsmobile. Then-division head John Rock (who had recently arrived from the GMC division) proposed using the Aurora name to replace the Oldsmobile brand entirely and offer cars similarly to GM's nascent Saturn division (a plan ultimately nixed by the GM higher-ups, though for a time Saturn's no-haggle pricing was implemented). Instead, the Aurora used a stylized A emblem, foreshadowing a similar restyling of Oldsmobile's corporate "rocket" emblem for 1997.

During development, Tim Dunne in 1993 was driving a prototype Aurora, which was nearly totaled after a four-foot log fell from a Michigan Department of Natural Resources truck. Dunne was able to maneuver the Aurora and largely avoid major damage. Subsequently then-governor John Engler purchased an Aurora, having been a life-long Oldsmobile customer.

Oldsmobile subsequently borrowed Aurora styling cues for its Intrigue and compact Alero models.

== First generation (1995–1999) ==
First generation
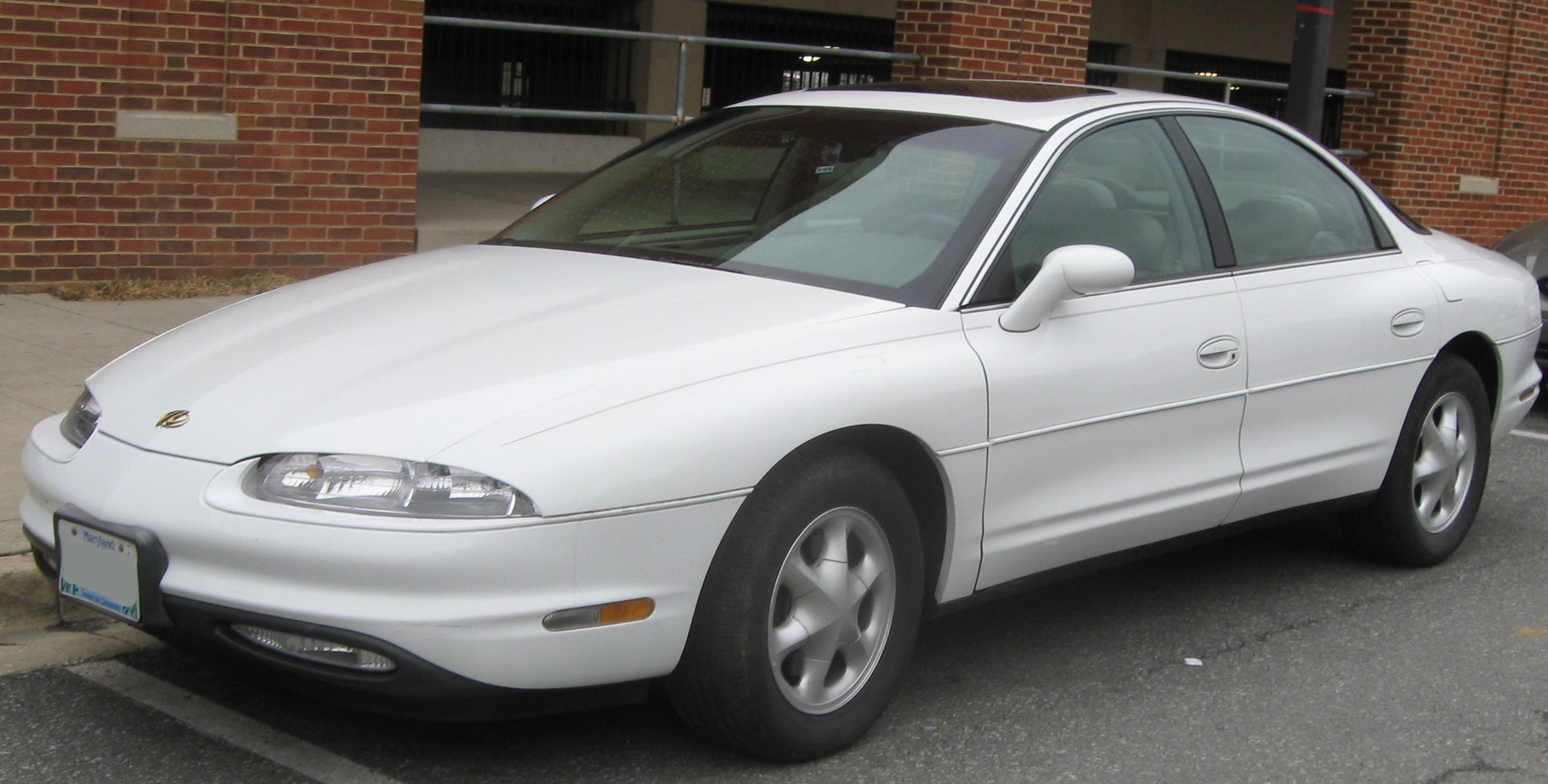

Overview
- Production: January 24, 1994 – June 25, 1999
- Model years: 1995–1999
- Designer: Dennis Burke (1989)

Body and chassis
- Platform: G-body
- Related: Buick Riviera; Buick Park Avenue; Cadillac Seville; Cadillac DeVille

Powertrain
- Engine: Gasoline: 4.0 L L47 V8
- Transmission: 4-speed 4T80-E automatic

Dimensions
- Wheelbase: 113.8 in (2,891 mm)
- Length: 205.4 in (5,217 mm)
- Width: 74.4 in (1,890 mm)
- Height: 55.4 in (1,407 mm)
- Curb weight: 3,967 lb (1,799 kg)

The Aurora went into production on January 24, 1994, and was released for the 1995 model year. It featured dual-zone climate control, driver and front passenger airbags, leather seating surfaces, genuine burl walnut interior accents, six-speaker sound system with in-dash cd-cassette, and eight-way power adjustable front seats with 2-position memory. An onboard computer displaying the date, current gas consumption, and other information was also standard, and was mounted in the center of the dashboard, above the factory radio and climate controls. Options included a power sunroof, Bose Acoustimass premium amplified sound system, heated front seats, and Autobahn package.

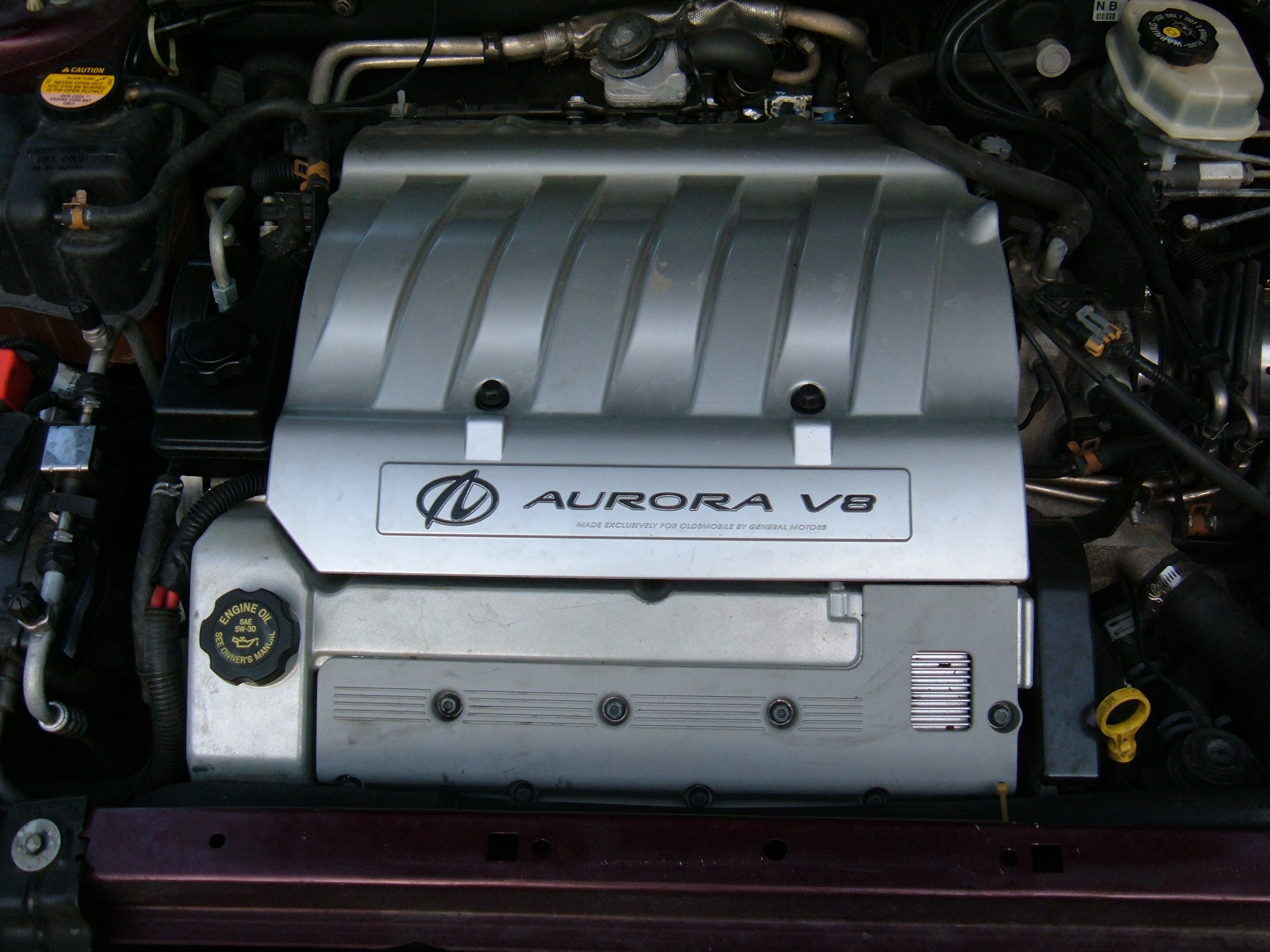
The Aurora's 4.0 L V8

The Aurora came standard with Oldsmobile's 4.0 L (3,995 cc; 243.8 cu in) L47 V8 engine, a DOHC engine based on Cadillac's 4.6 L Northstar V8. The Northstar engine and 4T80-E had been exclusive to Cadillac prior to the Aurora. The L47 put out 250 hp (186 kW) at 5600 rpm and 260 lb⋅ft (353 N⋅m) torque at 4400 rpm. The Aurora used a four-speed automatic transmission with driver selectable "normal" and "power" shift modes. A highly modified 650 hp (485 kW) version of this engine was used by General Motors racing division initially for Indy Racing League and IMSA competition starting in 1995 with the GM-supported Aurora GTS-1 racing program, then was later used in the Cadillac Northstar LMP program in 2000. Both engines retained the 4.0 L capacity, but the Northstar LMP version was twin-turbocharged. The Aurora had a drag coefficient of 0.32.

The Aurora was noted for its engine, build quality, ride, and structural integrity. During normal crush-to-failure tests to evaluate body torsional rigidity, the Aurora's unibody construction broke GM's testing machine. A frame-crusher otherwise used to test stronger truck frames had to be used, with the car twice exceeding federal standards for passenger cars.

First-generation Auroras were manufactured in Lake Orion, Michigan, along with the Buick LeSabre, Buick Park Avenue, Buick Riviera, Oldsmobile 88, Oldsmobile 98 and Pontiac Bonneville.

=== 1996 ===
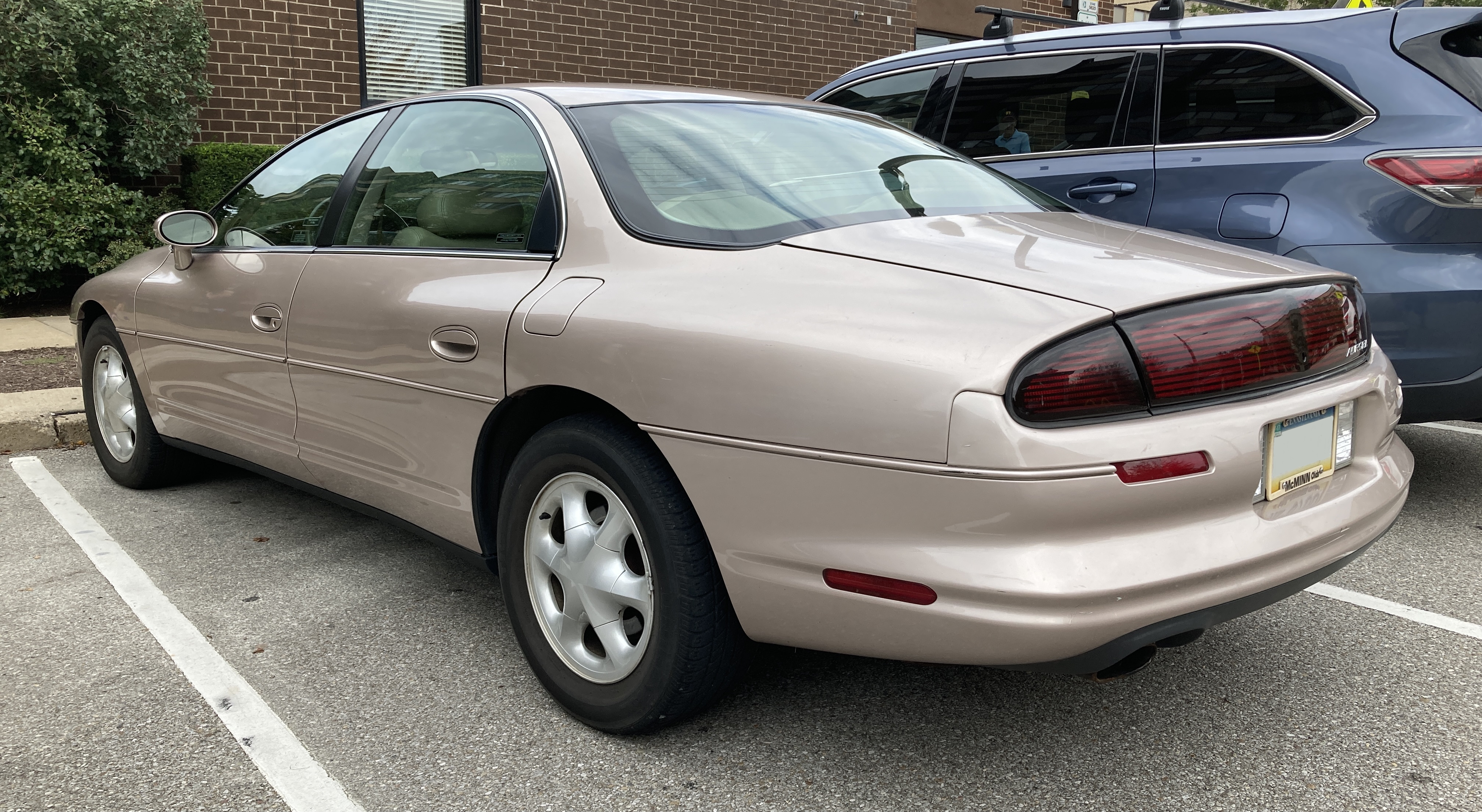
Oldsmobile Aurora 1st Generation rear view

- For 1996, Oldsmobile made some minor revisions to the Aurora including new rear glass which has less distortion than previous models.

Further revisions include daytime running lights and OBD II compliant on-board diagnostic systems, tweaking the climate control and safety alarm, a revised keyless entry system with new features and the short list of optional equipment was expanded to include chrome wheels and a gold trim package. The 1996-'99 models also had the passenger temperature toggle buttons on the middle-right portion of the instrument panel replaced with air recirculator buttons.

- Chrome wheels are now an option.
- There were some minor equipment changes.

=== 1997 ===
There were minor changes for the Aurora in 1997. A new in-dash CD player for the Bose sound system highlighted the improvements. Another new feature was a tilt-down right-outside mirror that enhances the driver's view of close objects, whenever the shifter is placed in reverse. The underside of the door handles were slightly recontoured to minimize slipping fingers when the handles are pulled. Seat belt release buttons were moved from the face of the buckle to the end for improved convenience. An electronic compass was added to the inside rear-view mirror. Larger front brakes came along with cast aluminum front control arms and steering knuckles. The rear ashtray assembly was changed from a click-lock face to a pull-up face. Finally, the spare tire cover and jack cradle assembly was changed from the jack and cover being bolted down to one where the jack sat in a plastic "bucket" inside the spare with the cover simply placed on top. On some 1997 models, a modest "Oldsmobile" badge returned to the right-rear corner of the car along with the Aurora name.

=== 1998 ===
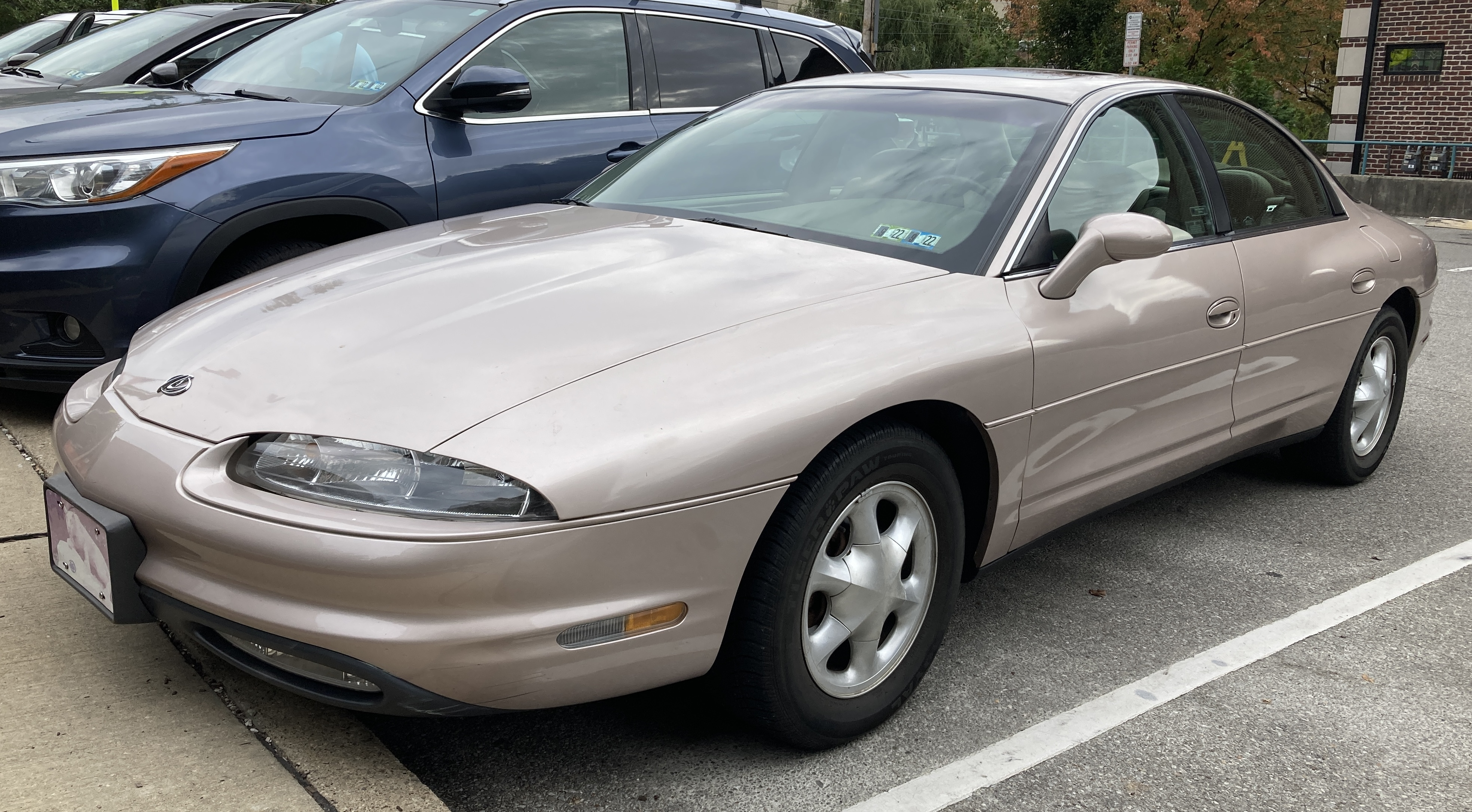
1998 Oldsmobile Aurora

The 1998 model had a few minor refinement changes to the brakes, suspension, steering and emissions controls. A new front control arm design with front hydraulic bushing and rear cross axis ball joint for enhanced ride smoothness and better isolation from road noise and vibration. Internal rebound springs added to front struts for improved body motion control and to minimize crash-through. Increased wheel travel (3 mm) and redesigned jounce bumpers for softer feel at full travel. Dual durometer cradle mounts for improved isolation. Premium valving and damping in the front and rear struts for a higher refinement in calibration. There were more accurate wheel sensors for improved ABS actuation. New steering calibration for more on-center feel and reduced parking effort.

GM's previously optional OnStar system, standard for this year, uses a dedicated button on the cellular telephone putting drivers in contact with an information center that can provide them with emergency assistance. The system uses no transmitters to determine the vehicle's location and provide route information to any destination.

Almost all of the changes made to the Aurora for 1998 were aimed at refining what was already a highly regarded suspension system.

=== 1999 ===
The last year for the first generation Aurora. Changes for 1999 included additional engine mounts for improved engine stability.

Production for this generation ended on June 25, 1999. No 2000 models were produced.

== Second generation (2001–2003) ==
Second generation
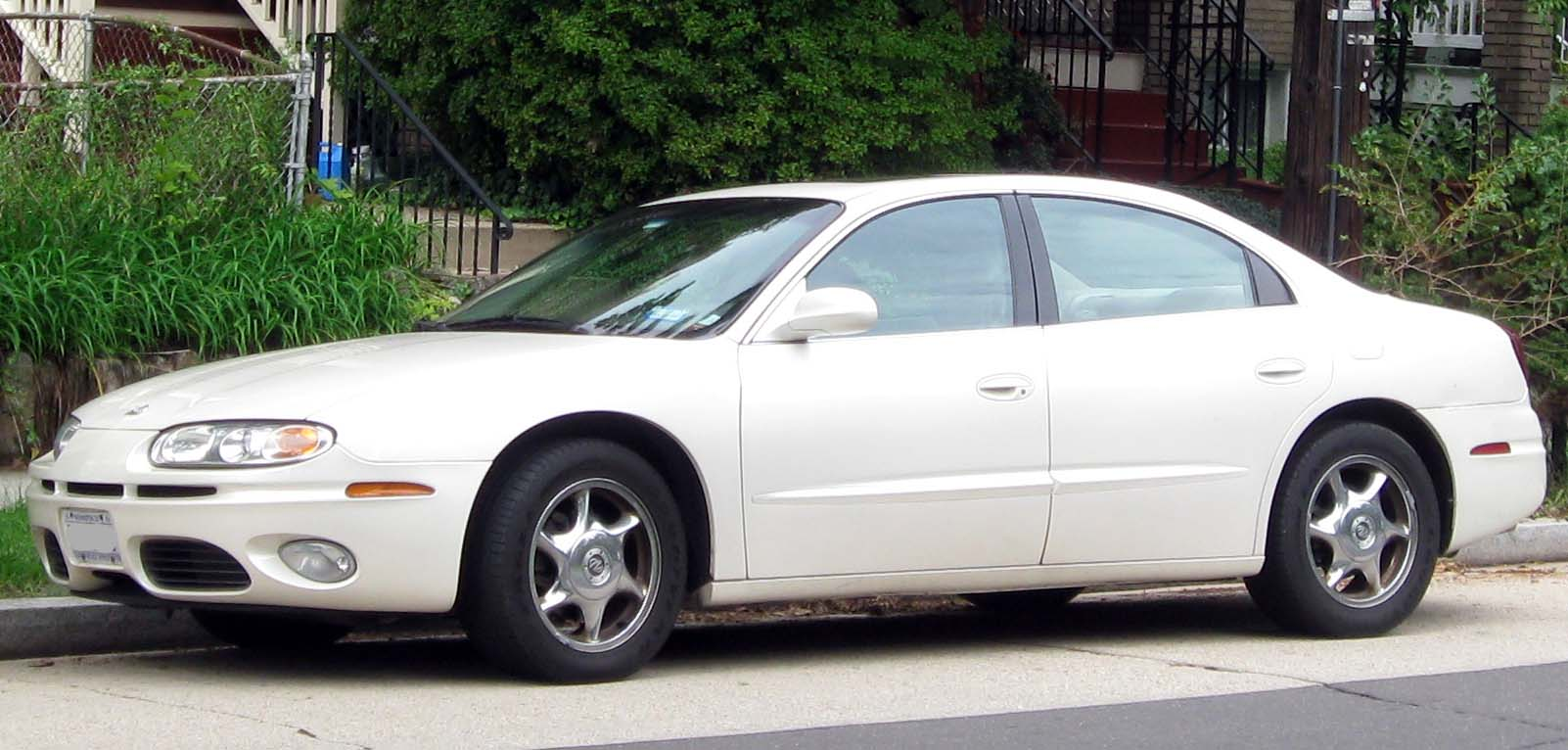

Overview
- Production: November 1, 1999 – March 28, 2003
- Model years: 2001–2003
- Designer: Dennis Burke (1996)

Body and chassis
- Platform: G-body
- Related: Buick LeSabre; Buick Park Avenue; Pontiac Bonneville; Cadillac Seville; Cadillac DeVille

Powertrain
- Engine: Gasoline: 3.5 L LX5 V6 4.0 L L47 V8
- Transmission: 4-speed 4T65-E automatic 4-speed 4T80-E automatic

Dimensions
- Wheelbase: 112.2 in (2,850 mm)
- Length: 199.3 in (5,062 mm)
- Width: 72.9 in (1,852 mm)
- Height: 56.7 in (1,440 mm)
- Curb weight: 3,627 lb (1,645 kg)

Oldsmobile's original intention for the second generation was to move the Aurora further upmarket, retaining its V8-only drivetrain and sharing a platform with the new Buick Riviera, as with the first gen Aurora. This would have created more room within the Oldsmobile line for a four-door Eighty-Eight successor to be marketed as the "Antares" (though there was talk of naming it the Aurora V-6 or Aurora 6, as the Antares name was not liked during focus group testing); this platform was known internally as "G-plus". Buick dropped its Riviera development plans at the same time Oldsmobile faced fiscal trouble. The division was then forced to re-engineer the Antares into an acceptable Aurora in a short time. Still using the G-body design, the re-engineered Aurora was the result, retaining its 4.0 V8 Northstar mounted to a 4T80-E automatic transmission.

The second generation Aurora also offered a V6 engine, the LX5, a version of the DOHC Aurora V8 with six cylinders. The V6-powered Aurora was manufactured solely for the 2001 and 2002 model years, with production ending in mid-2002.

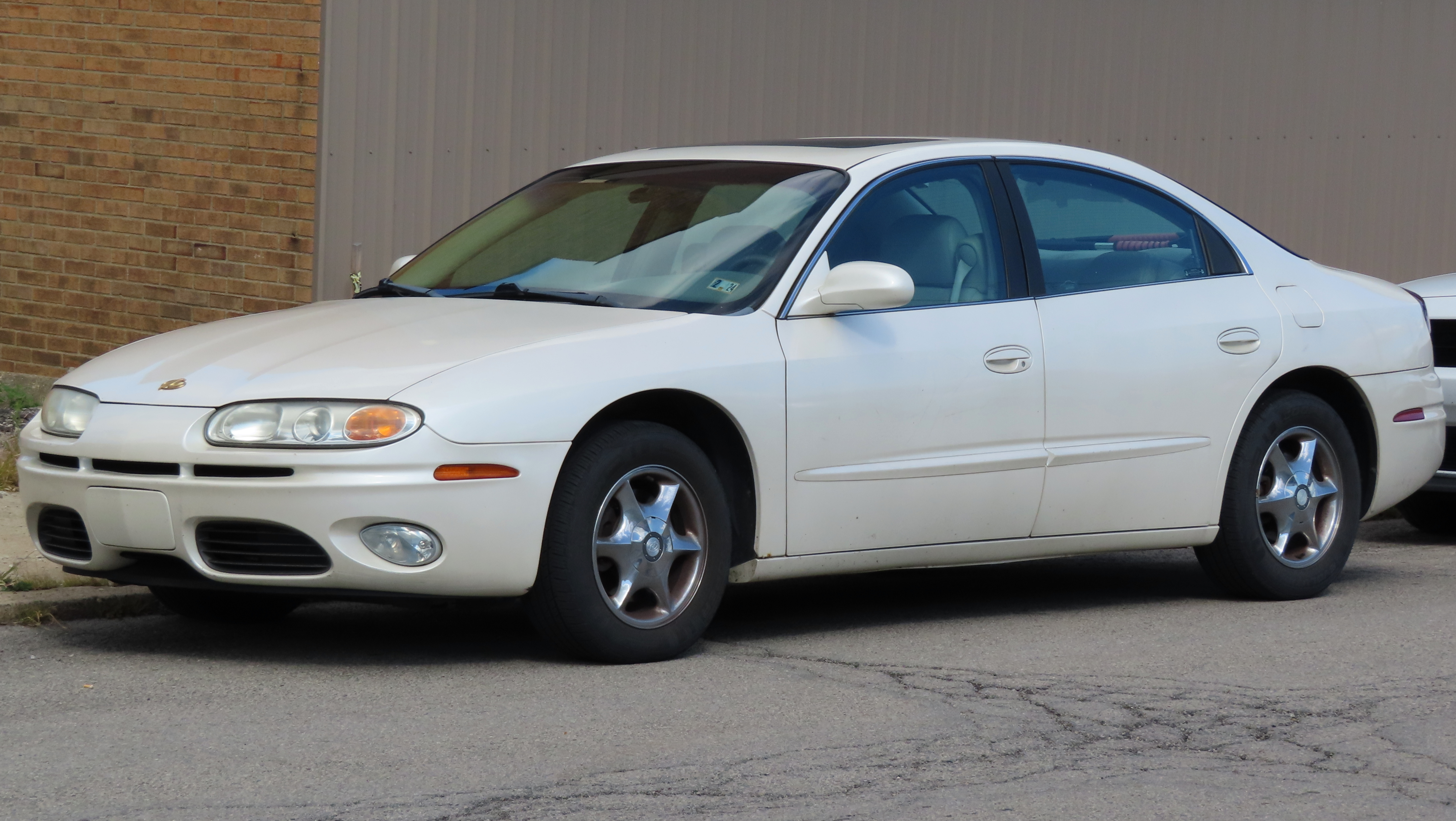
2002 Oldsmobile Aurora 3.5

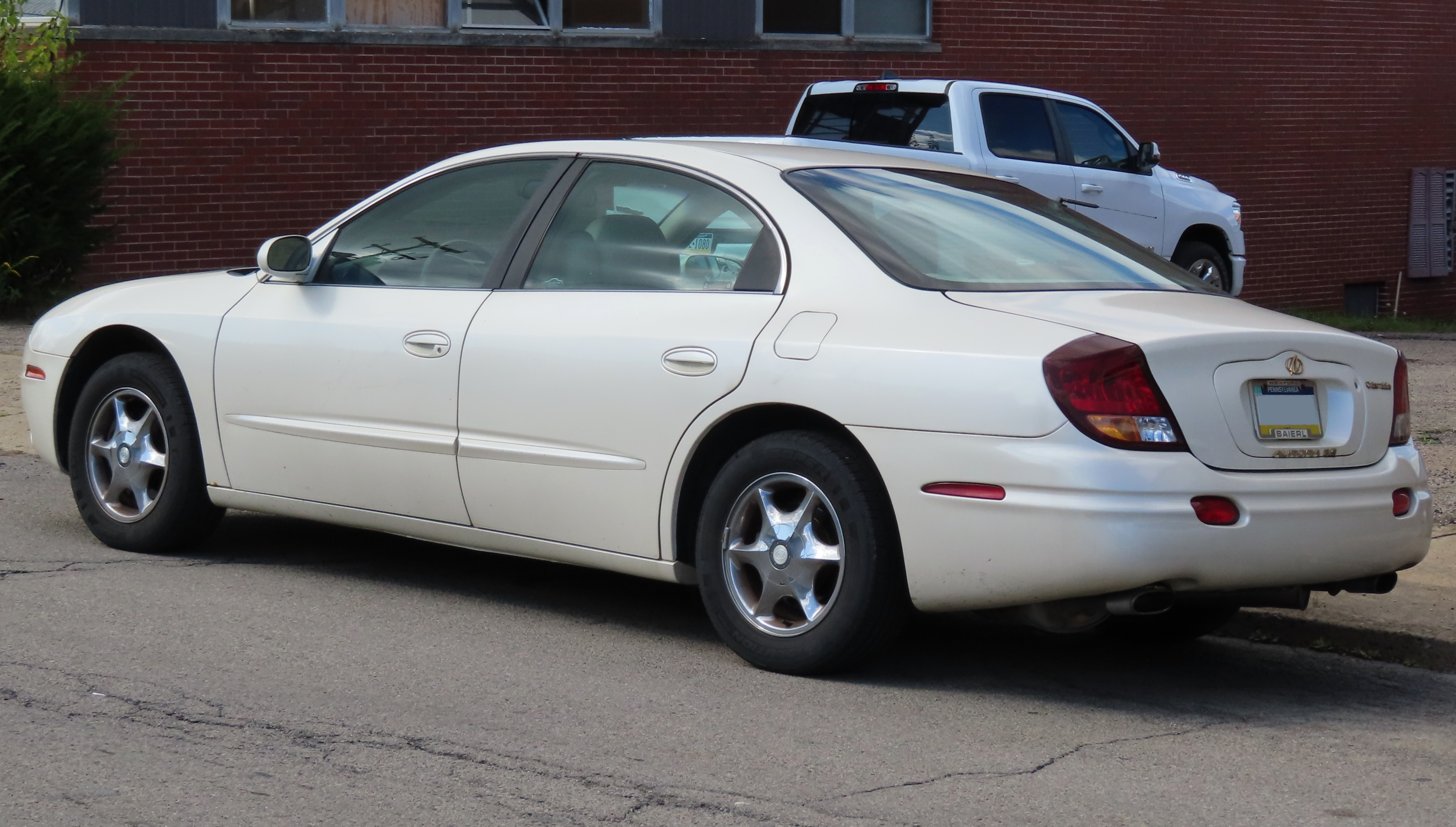
Oldsmobile Aurora 2nd Generation rear view

This Aurora did not sell as well as the original, overshadowed by GM's announcement in December 2000 that the Oldsmobile marque was to be phased out over the next several years. Though still retaining its unique styling, it now also shared design cues with other Oldsmobiles. The second generation Aurora was about six inches shorter than was the first generation. Automobile magazine wrote that "The Aurora's new look is not quite as sensuous or elegant as that of the outgoing model," but the Auto Channel review said, "it was better in every respect."

The second generation Aurora went into production on November 1, 1999, and went on sale in February 2000 as a 2001 model. The last V6-powered Auroras was assembled on June 21, 2002. The final 500 Auroras ended production on March 28, 2003. These were all a special burgundy color (called "Dark Cherry Metallic"), had special chrome wheels, and "Final 500" badging. The Orion, Michigan plant built a total of 68,552 second-generation Auroras; 53,640 in 2001, 10,865 in 2002, and 4,047 in 2003.

=== Standard and optional equipment ===
The second-generation Oldsmobile Aurora featured as standard equipment, keyless entry, security alarm, luxury leather-trimmed seating surfaces with power adjustments for the driver's seat, an AM-FM stereo with Radio Data System (RDS) and cassette and single-disc CD players, a six-speaker sound system, leather door panel inserts, wood interior trim, automatic climate control, OnStar in-vehicle telematics system (later introduction), steering wheel-mounted climate and radio controls, a leather-wrapped steering wheel, power trunk release from the keyless entry remote, a multi-function driver's information center mounted above the factory radio and climate controls, a rear bench seat with fold-down center armrest, luxury-styled alloy wheels, a spare tire and wheel, automatic front head and fog lamps, a 3.5L V6 engine, a 4-speed automatic transmission, front-wheel-drive (FWD), front and side SRS airbags.

Optional equipment included a driver's memory package with memory front driver's seat and memory for radio presets, heated dual front bucket seats, a premium audio system with external amplifier by Bose, a power tilt-and-sliding sunroof, chrome-finished alloy wheels, a gold emblem package for the front and rear Oldsmobile emblems, Aurora emblem, and 3.5 or 4.0 emblems, and the 4.0L Northstar V8 engine (this engine became standard equipment in 2003 for the Aurora's final year of production).

Starting in 2002, a voice-activated, CD-ROM based navigation system was available. The 17-inch wheels’ plastic hubcaps on the second generation V8 Auroras (except for the "Final 500" which used modified Cadillac wheels) were made with mold number 442.

=== Engines ===
- 2001–2002: LX5 3.5 L (3,473 cc; 211.9 cu in) V6, 215 hp (160 kW) at 5600 rpm, 234 lb⋅ft (317 N⋅m) torque at 4400 rpm.
- 2001–2003: L47 4.0 L (3,995 cc; 243.8 cu in) V8, 250 hp (186 kW) at 5600 rpm, 260 lb⋅ft (353 N⋅m) torque at 4400 rpm.

== Production numbers ==
Gen I and Gen II Aurora production
	1995	1996	1997	1998	1999	2000	2001	2002	2003	All years
Gen I	47,831	24,133	27,927	25,721	19,635					145,247
Gen II							53,640	10,865	4,047	68,552
Total										213,799

== Pace car ==
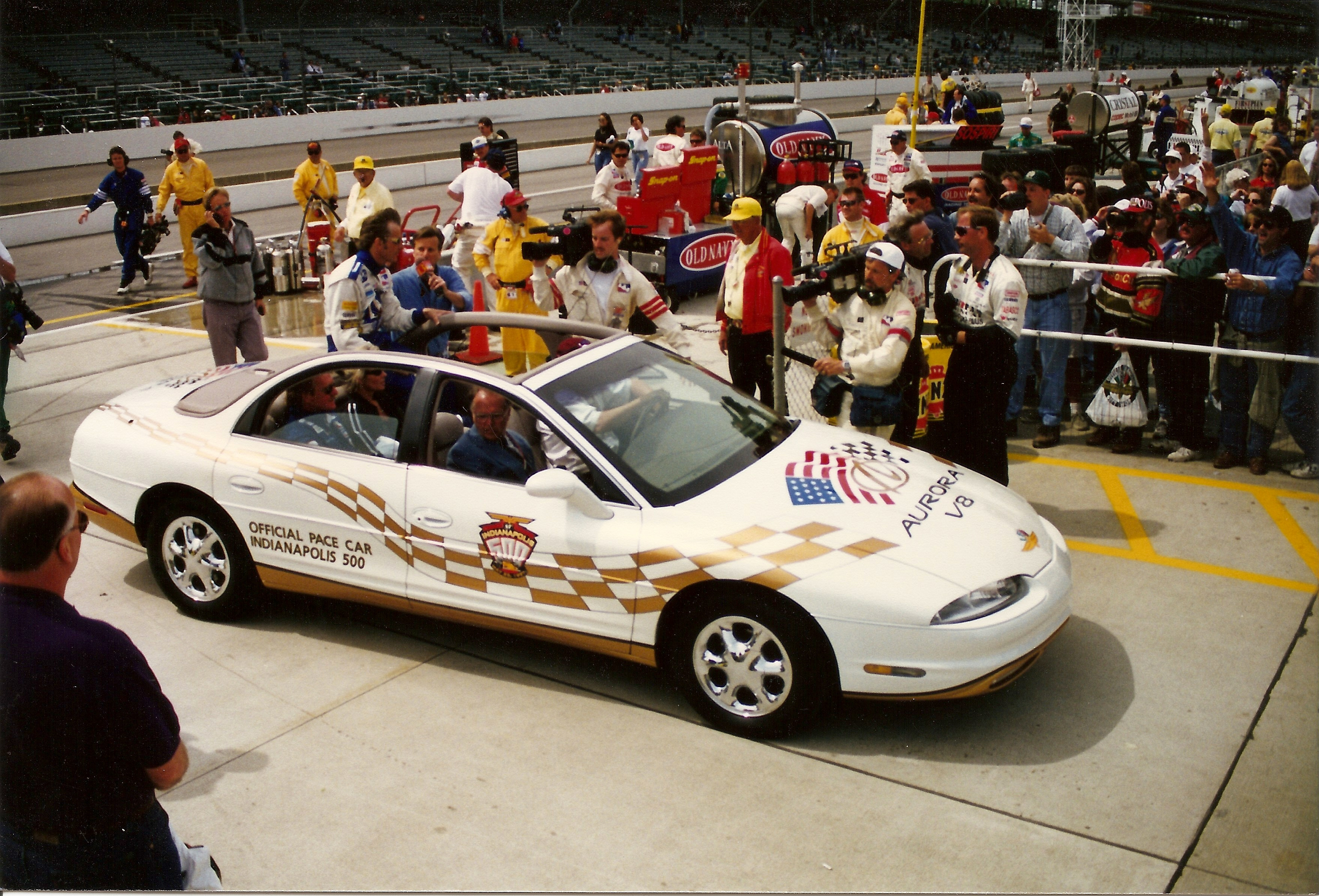
1997 Oldsmobile Aurora Indy 500 Pace Car

Aurora was the official pace car of the 1997 and 2000 Indianapolis 500. At the beginning of the race in 1997, the pace car was driven by three-time Indy 500 winner Johnny Rutherford. At the beginning of the 2000 race, the pace car was driven by actor Anthony Edwards. These cars marked the ninth and tenth time an Oldsmobile had paced the Indianapolis 500 race.

== See also ==
- Northstar engine series
