= Salic Law (solitaire) =

Salic Law is a solitaire card game using two decks of 52 playing cards each. It is named after the Salic Law which prohibits women from ascending to the throne or obtaining inheritance.

== Rules ==
First, the Queens are taken out of the stock. Then a King is placed on the tableau. The rest on the cards are shuffled and dealt on the King to form a column. The player deals as many cards over the King until another King appears, starting a new column. This is done until all eight Kings are laid out and all cards have been dealt, resulting in eight columns of various lengths.

During dealing, whenever an Ace appears, it is put onto the foundations. In fact, once aces are in the foundations over the kings, they can be built up to Jacks regardless of suit, even while dealing is in progress as long as the top cards of the columns already dealt are available for play, as well as any applicable card that appears during dealing.

Once all cards have been dealt, building to the foundations continue. Cards on the tableau cannot be built on each other. However, a column containing just a King is considered vacant and any card can be placed there. One card can be moved at a time and as mentioned earlier, the top card of each column is available for play.

The game is won when all cards available are placed on the foundations with the Jacks on the top of the foundations and the Kings exposed.

Sometimes, players still give the Queens a decorative role by putting them between the foundations and the King columns or shuffling them with the rest of the deck and putting them between the foundations and the columns later.

== Variants ==
In the rules described by David Parlett, when a King becomes exposed in the tableau it is permissible to transfer the end-card of a column to it as a temporary reserve. Under this rule the game can often be completed successfully. Some implementations of Salic Law in software programs disallow this, making the game much harder to win.

Intrigue is similar to Salic Law, but also involves the queens and building in the foundations goes both ways, downwards from the 5s and upwards from the 6s. Also closely related to Salic Law is Faerie Queen.

== See also ==
- List of solitaire games
- Glossary of solitaire terms
