= Oldsmobile Tube Car =

1989 Concept Vehicle

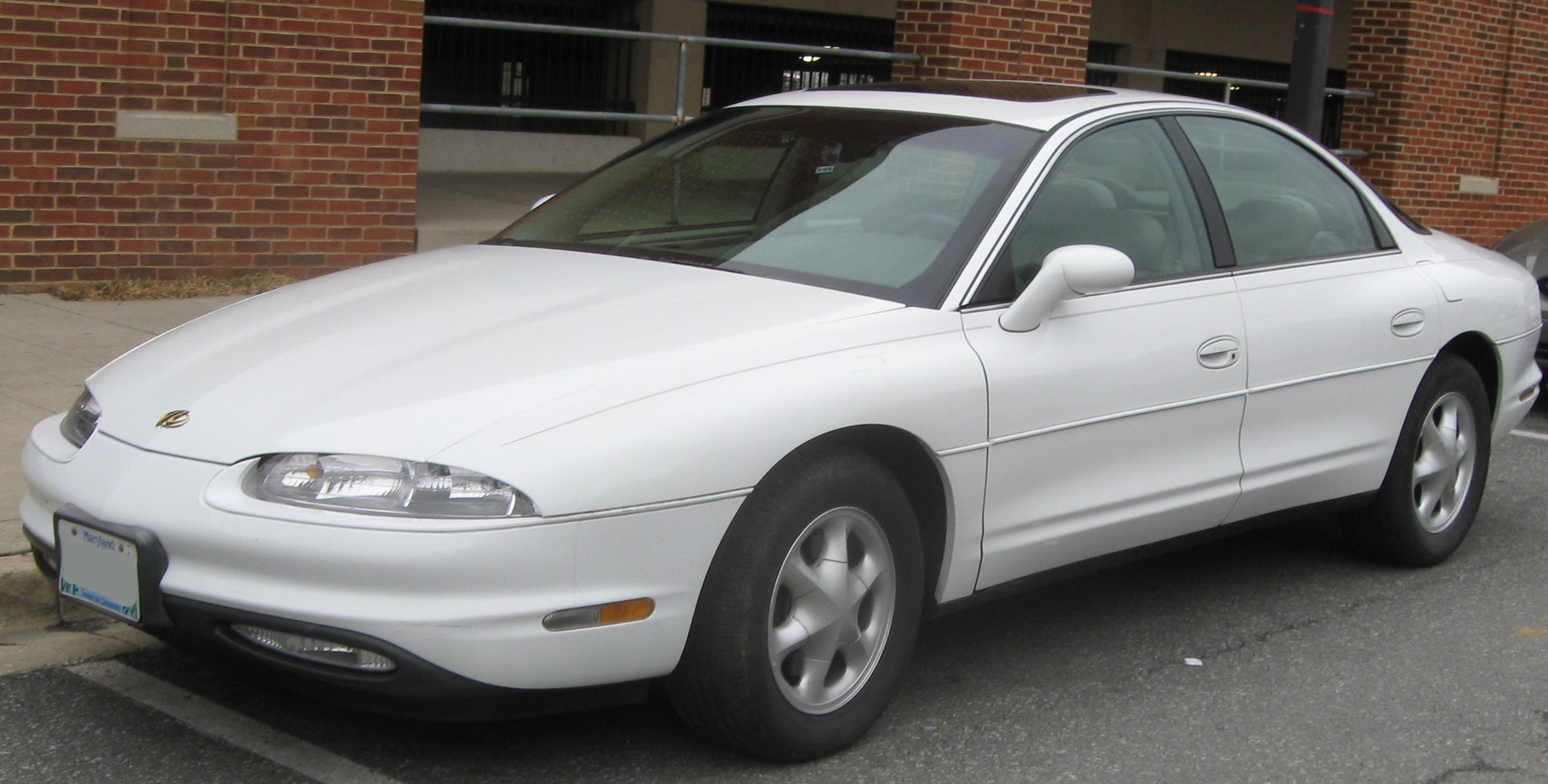
First generation Oldsmobile Aurora, the eventual production version of the Oldsmobile Tube Car.

The Oldsmobile Tube Car was a 1989 concept vehicle built by Oldsmobile that was the basis for the eventual 1995 production vehicle, the Oldsmobile Aurora. Despite still going under in 2004, Oldsmobile benefited greatly from the Aurora, which served as the archetype of Oldsmobile design for the next nine years.

Many of the Tube Car's features made it to the Aurora, such as its round shape, frameless windows, front fascia, and full-width taillight. The Aurora however, was a four-door sedan with conventional rear doors, rather than suicide doors. The current whereabouts of the Tube Car are unknown.
