= Cadillac DTS =

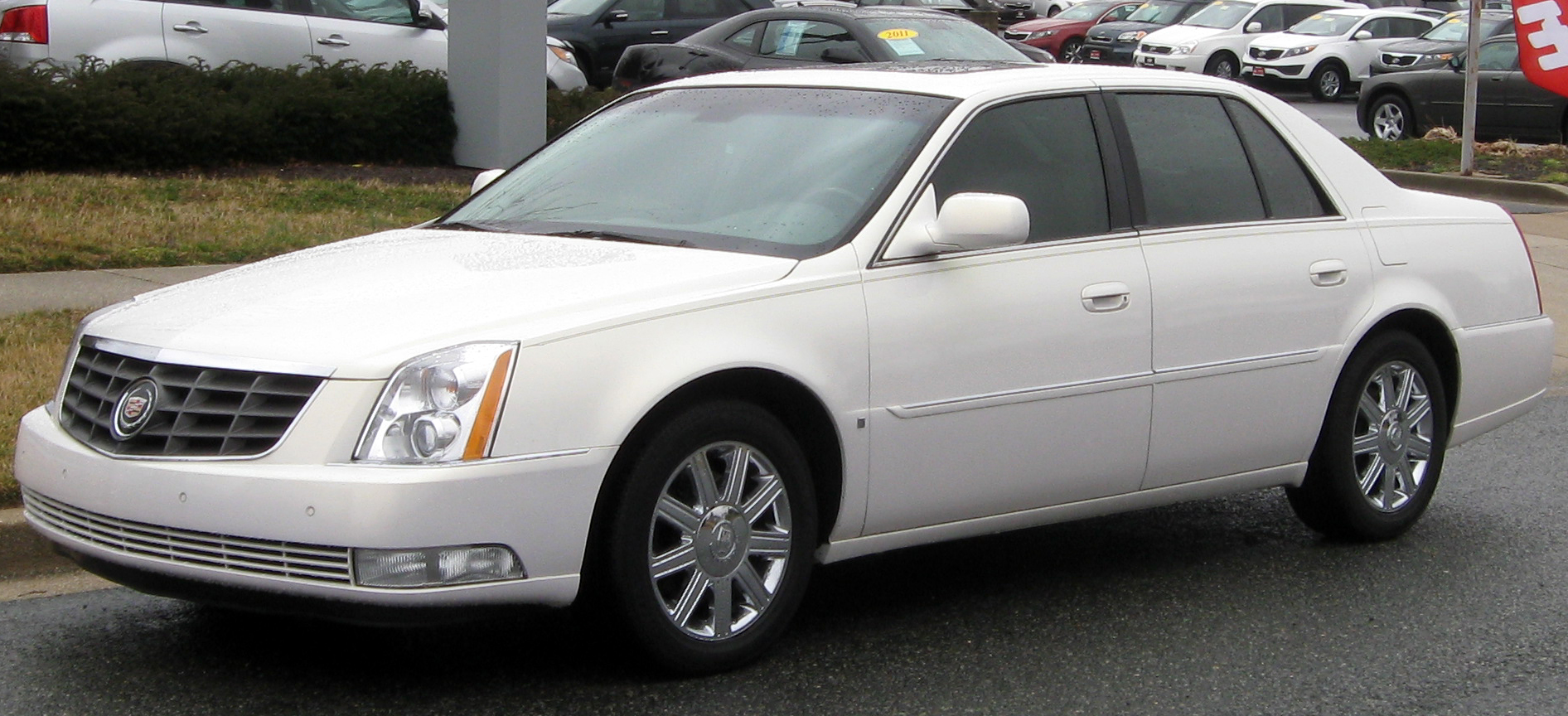

Overview
- Manufacturer: Cadillac
- Production: 2005 – May 2011
- Model years: 2006–2011
- Assembly: United States: Hamtramck, Michigan (Detroit/Hamtramck Assembly)
- Designer: Bryan Nesbitt

Body and chassis
- Class: Full-size luxury car
- Body style: 4-door sedan 4-door limousine
- Layout: Transverse FF layout
- Platform: GM G platform/GMX272
- Related: Buick Lucerne

Powertrain
- Engine: 4.6 L Northstar LD8 V8; 4.6 L Northstar L37 V8
- Transmission: 4-speed 4T80 automatic

Dimensions
- Wheelbase: 115.6 in (2,936 mm) (SWB); 123.6 in (3,139 mm) (LWB)
- Length: 207.6 in (5,273 mm) (SWB); 215.6 in (5,476 mm) (LWB)
- Width: 74.8 in (1,900 mm)
- Height: 57.6 in (1,463 mm)
- Curb weight: 4,009 lb (1,818 kg)

Chronology
- Predecessor: Cadillac DeVille
- Successor: Cadillac XTS

The Cadillac DTS (an initialism of DeVille Touring Sedan) was a full-size car that was built by the Cadillac division of General Motors from 2005 until May 2011. It was a four-door sedan that came in five- or six-seat variations. The DTS debuted at the 2005 Chicago Auto Show and was manufactured at GM's Detroit/Hamtramck Assembly factory. It used GM's G-platform for front-engine, front-wheel-drive automobiles. The DTS was a mildly revised iteration of the eighth-generation Deville, using the brand's new naming convention, set by the CTS and STS. A vehicle review written by Warren Brownby for the Los Angeles Times, stated "a large, exceptionally comfortable front-wheel-drive luxury sedan."

== Production and specifications ==
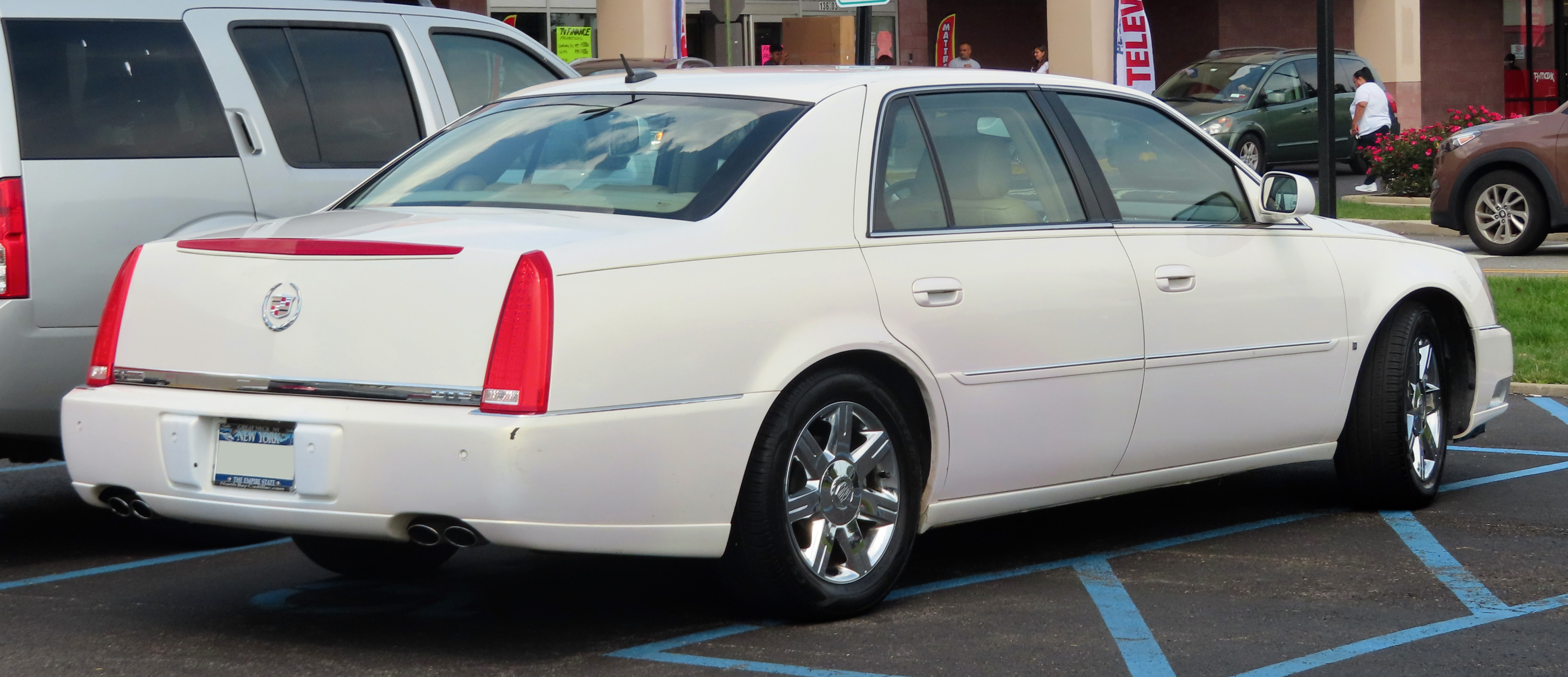
Cadillac DTS rear

Compared to its Deville predecessor, the DTS was mildly restyled rather than fully redesigned, featuring revised front-end sheet metal, front fascia, as well as rear decklid, rear quarter, and rear fascia.

The DTS used GM's G-platform, as denoted by the 4th letter in the VIN), and was powered by a transverse 32V Northstar V8, which produced 275 bhp (205 kW) in "Standard", "Luxury" and "Premium" trims. The DTS Platinum was equipped with 292 bhp (218 kW) version.

The base MSRP for the DTS at time of introduction was US$41,195 (equivalent to $67,900 in 2025), which was over 10% lower than the DeVille model it had replaced. The DTS offered front bucket seats with overall seating for five passengers, and six passenger (i.e., front bench) seating available as an optional feature. Standard features included multiple airbags, bi-functional xenon high-intensity discharge HID headlamps, leather seating surfaces, and power seats. Optional equipment included heated and cooled front seats and a heated rear seat, rain-sensing wipers, Bose audio system, DVD navigation, automatic dimming headlights, adaptive cruise control and Magnetic Ride Control suspension. A Platinum package became available in 2007 with special interior trim, badging, and other amenities.

GM phased out its small GM fender badges for all its vehicles, starting during the 2010 model year, including those on the DTS.

Model	Year	Engine	Power	Torque
Standard; Luxury I, II, III	2006	4.6 L Northstar LD8 V8	275 bhp (205 kW; 279 PS) at 5200 rpm	292 lb⋅ft (396 N⋅m) at 4400 rpm
Standard; Luxury I, II, III	2007–2008	4.6 L Northstar LD8 V8	275 bhp (205 kW; 279 PS) at 6000 rpm	295 lb⋅ft (400 N⋅m) at 4400 rpm
Standard; Luxury; Premium	2009–2011	4.6 L Northstar LD8 V8	275 bhp (205 kW; 279 PS) at 6000 rpm	295 lb⋅ft (400 N⋅m) at 4400 rpm
Performance	2006	4.6 L Northstar L37 V8	291 bhp (217 kW; 295 PS) at 5600 rpm	286 lb⋅ft (388 N⋅m) at 4400 rpm
Performance	2007–2009	4.6 L Northstar L37 V8	292 bhp (218 kW; 296 PS) at 6300 rpm	288 lb⋅ft (390 N⋅m) at 4500 rpm
Platinum	2008–2011	4.6 L Northstar L37 V8	292 bhp (218 kW; 296 PS) at 6300 rpm	288 lb⋅ft (390 N⋅m) at 4500 rpm

=== DTS-L ===
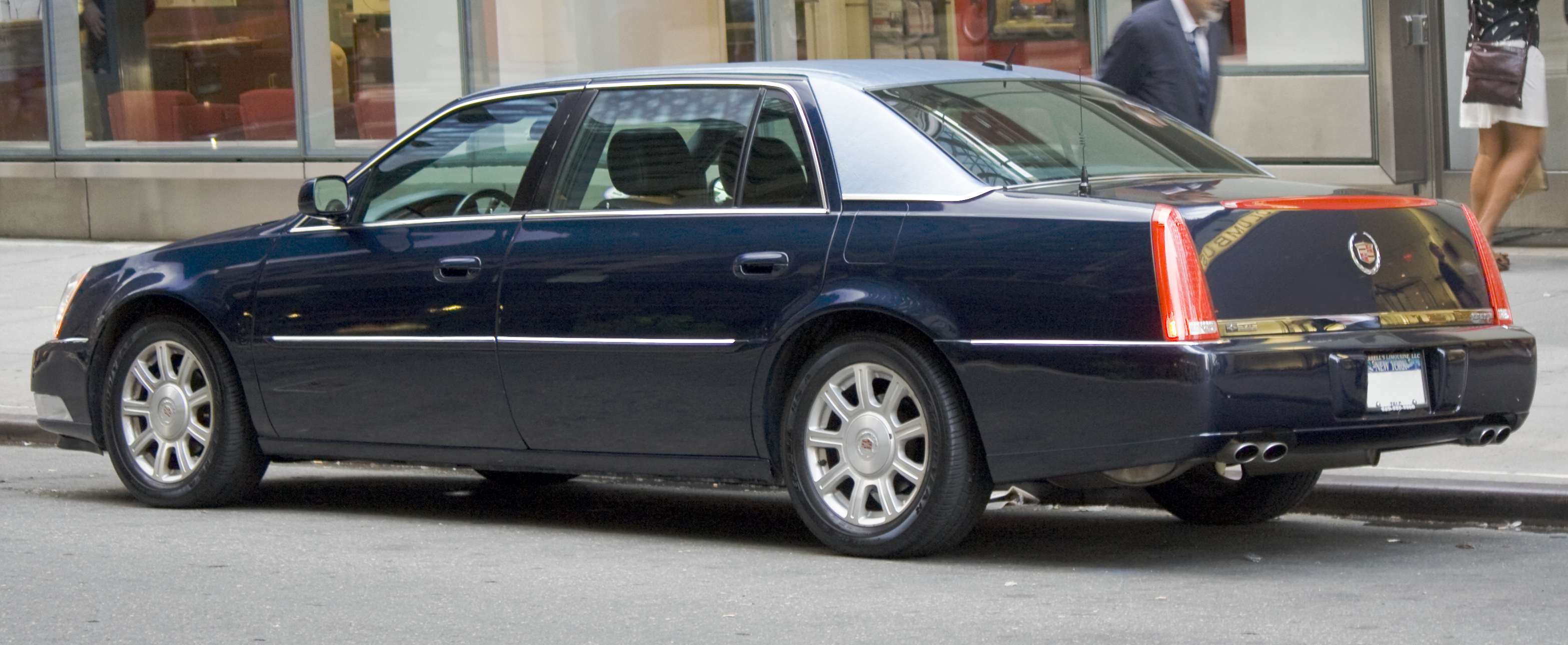
2008 Cadillac DTS-L

Designed especially for the limousine market, the lightly stretched DTS-L was released in November 2006 for the 2007 model year. Developed and finished by Accubuilt, this version was touted as having greater rear legroom. Early DTS-L Cadillacs are easily recognized by the wider rear C-pillar, similar to the one used on the older Fleetwood 75 Series. This was necessitated by the use of the standard length DTS rear door, which left a strange-looking space between the rear wheelwell and door. In 2008, a new version with longer rear doors was introduced. This change also meant that the C-pillars became considerably slimmer. Despite these efforts, the low production DTS-L soon disappeared from the marketplace.

==== Other uses ====
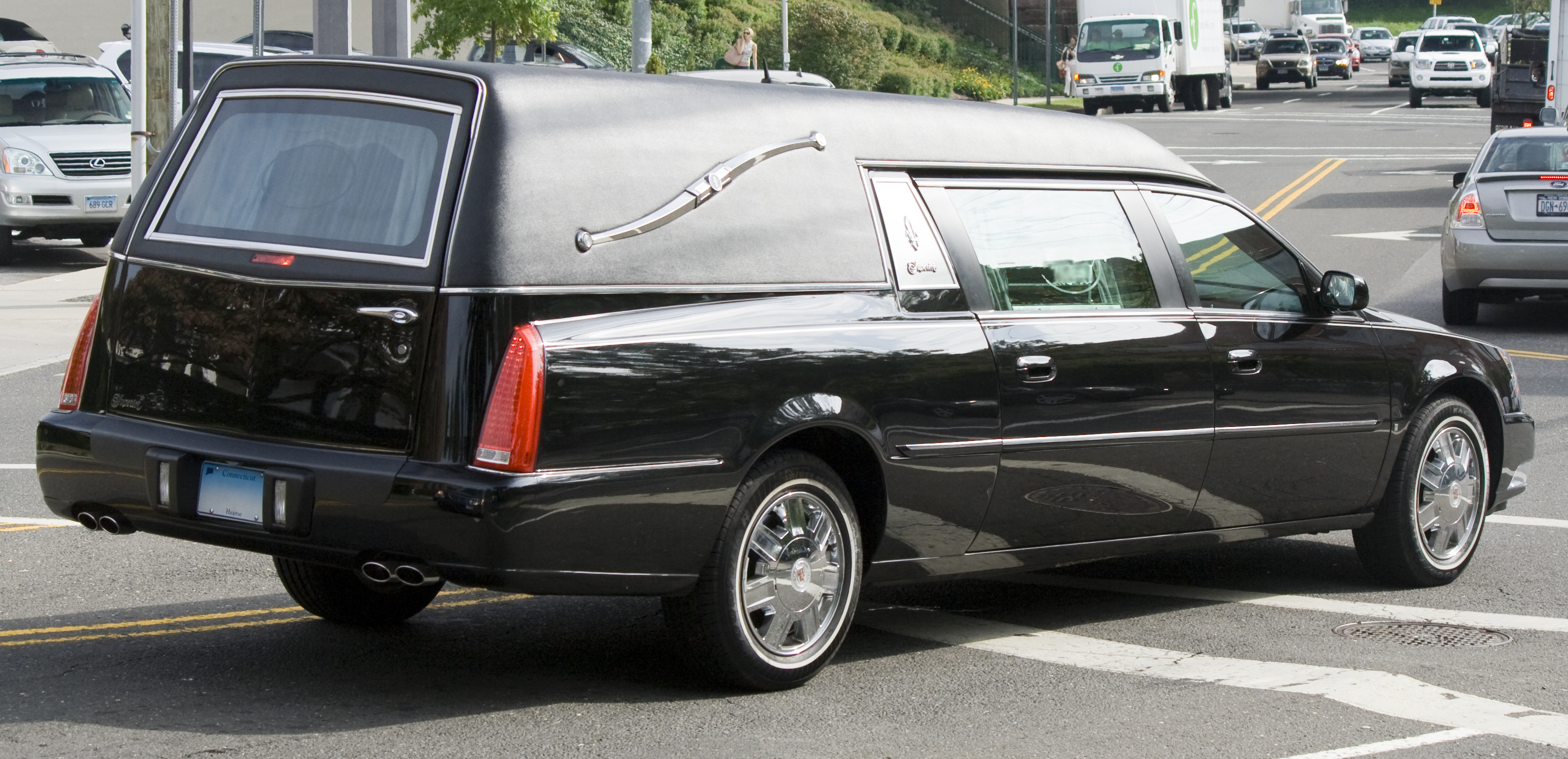
Cadillac DTS hearse

The DTS was available as a "coachbuilder" chassis for aftermarket conversion into either limousines, or hearses. The limousine model was designated V4U, and the hearse model was designated B9Q. These were only available to manufacturers named as Cadillac Master Coachbuilders, meaning they were certified by General Motors to modify them. The coachbuilder chassis are an incomplete car, with no rear doors, trunk, rear windshield, and other parts not used during the conversion. These models also included eight lug wheels, upgraded suspension components, and a transmission cooler.

== Presidential State Car ==
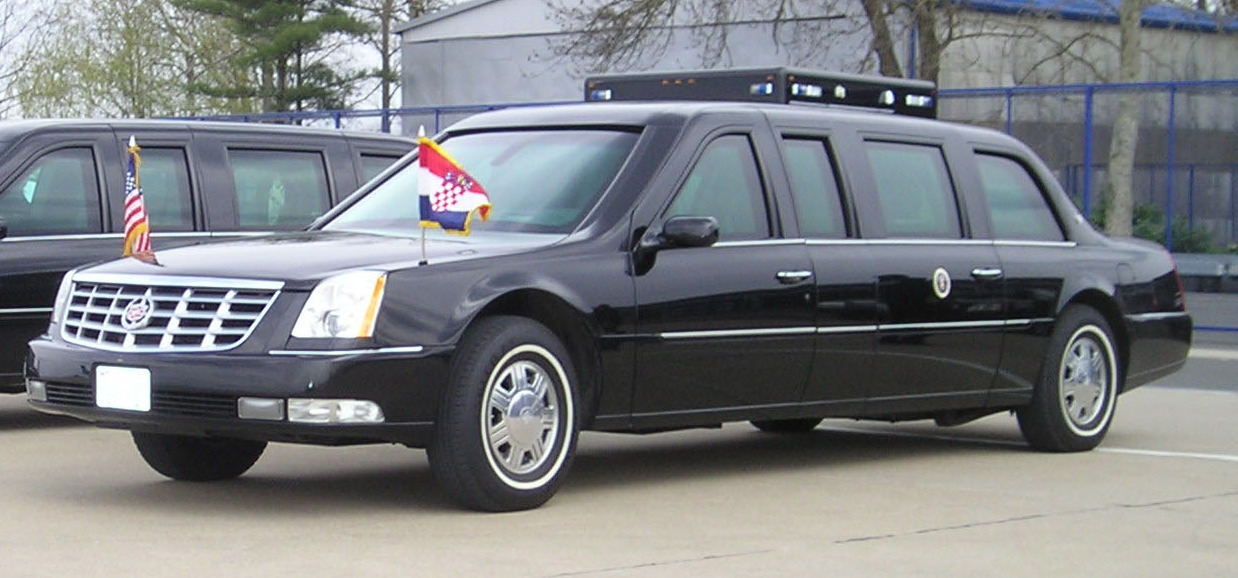
The official limousine of former U.S. President George W. Bush

In 2005, a specially designed and outfitted armored vehicle with Cadillac DTS styling (actually a modified medium-duty GMC truck with four-wheel drive chassis) with extra high-roof debuted during the second inauguration of U.S. President George W. Bush, which also served as the debut for the DTS before its official debut at the Chicago Auto Show. While details of the modified vehicle, codenamed "Stagecoach", remain classified, previous such vehicles indicate that it would have been upgraded with advanced armor and safety features in order to protect the President from various threats.

Shorter-wheelbase armored DTSes are also cars used by the Vice President of the United States at least since 2010.

A modified DTS was also used by former Prime Minister of Canada Stephen Harper.

== Yearly American sales ==
Calendar Year	Total sales
2005	23,322
2006	58,224
2007	51,469
2008	30,479
2009	17,330
2010	18,640
2011	11,589
2012	465

== Next generation ==
The next full-size front-wheel drive Cadillac sedan was the XTS which went on sale in June 2012 as a 2013 model. A second full-size sedan, the rear-wheel drive CT6, was added to the lineup in 2016.

Prior to bankruptcy, GM had considered a rear-drive sedan, powered by the new Ultra V8 engine (replacement for the Northstar), to bow for 2010. GM later stopped development of new North American Zeta-based models and canceled the Ultra V8 engine.
