= Oldsmobile Antares =

Overview
- Manufacturer: Oldsmobile (General Motors)
- Production: Concept car only

Body and chassis
- Class: Mid-size luxury car
- Body style: 4-door sedan
- Layout: Rear-wheel-drive
- Related: Oldsmobile Intrigue

The Oldsmobile Antares was a 1995 concept car built by Oldsmobile. The Antares's design was heavily based on Oldsmobile's new "Aurora-look", derived from the 1994 Oldsmobile Aurora.

The Antares is named after a bright star in the Southern Hemisphere, a prominent star in the constellation Scorpius. The Antares is noted as the first vehicle to wear Oldsmobile's then-new corporate emblem.

It shared the same 113.5 inch wheelbase as the Aurora, but was 17 inches shorter in length. Contrary to belief, the Antares' design cues were not used in the Oldsmobile Intrigue. Rather, the Intrigue was designed in 1993.

The original intention of the Antares was to be the 4-door successor of the Oldsmobile Eighty-Eight. Oldsmobile had intended to push the Aurora further upmarket for the second generation, which would have opened up more room within the lineup for the Antares (also possibly to be named the Aurora V-6 or simply Aurora 6, as focus group testing revealed a dislike for the Antares name). The second generation Aurora was to ride on the same platform as the redesigned Buick Riviera, as the original had done, however, Buick axed the Riviera as a result of the sales of all coupes in the North American market declining at the time. The discontinuation of the Riviera forced Oldsmobile to re-engineer the Antares into an acceptable Aurora in a short time. As a result, the Antares never went beyond the concept car phase, and the redesigned Aurora served as the replacement for the Eighty-Eight.

The Antares, along with the Intrigue, were designed by Brigid O'Kane.

At its debut at the 1995 North American International Auto Show, the Antares was awarded the "Best Concept Car" award by AutoWeek magazine.
