= Torque-to-yield fastener =

Type of fastener

A torque to yield fastener (TTY) or stretch bolt is a fastener which is torqued beyond the state of elasticity and therefore undergoes plastic deformation, causing it to become permanently elongated.

== Fastener ==
Torquing a fastener close to its yield point results in a residual axial preloading of the fastener which, depending on service conditions, can significantly increase the fatigue life of the fastener. When the applied service load doesn't exceed the clamping force of the fastener, the strain of the fastener will be lower than when the preloading is smaller than the applied load. It is therefore beneficial in high-frequency high-load situations with a higher risk of fatigue related failure, like a bolted down cylinder head, to use torque to yield bolts.

The torque applied to the fastener must be determined such that it does not contribute to a service condition where the fastener enters a low-cycle fatigue regime. In general, the use of torque-to-yield fasteners is deprecated except in cases where the materials and structures comprising the entire assembly are certified to be within tolerances.

- Advantage: The service lifetime can be predicted, and regular maintenance intervals determined with a tolerable degree of certainty.
- Disadvantage: TTY hardware must be assumed to be compromised and must be removed from service if subsequently loosened, tightened, or damaged.
