= The Intrigues =

The Intrigues were an American four-piece music group from Philadelphia, formed in 1968 consisting of Alfred Brown, James Harris, James Lee and Ronald Hamilton. Among their U.S. hits were "In a Moment", produced by Bobby Martin and Thom Bell, and "The Language of Love", co-produced by Van McCoy. An LP, by the same name as their hit "In a Moment", was produced in 1970 but did not achieve the same success. After an extended hiatus, starting in 1972, the group began recording again in 1985. William Nobles Sr. became the group's lead vocalist and guitarist. The original "The Intrigues" was created in Boston, MA a few years before "The Intrigues" from Philadelphia.

== Career ==
"In a Moment"

The single "In a Moment" was released on Yew 1001 in 1969. "In a Moment" made its debut on the Cash Box Top 100 chart at no. 99 on the week of July 26, 1969.

On the week of August 16, "In a Moment" made its debut on the Cash Box Top 50 in R&B Locations chart. The single got to No. 37 on the Cash Box Top 100 chart on the week of September 27.

Further activities

The single "I'm Gonna Love You" was reviewed in the Picks of the week section of the November 22, 1969 issue of Cash Box. Backed with "Gotta Find Out for Myself", the teen and R&B sales potential was noted.

In September 1971, their single "To Make a World" b/w "Mojo Hanna" was released on Yew Records Y-1013. The A-side was written and produced by Joe Cobb and Van McCoy. With the pop following the group already had, Cash Box predicted that it would be another hit for them.

== Singles ==
Year	Title	Chart Positions	
Year	Title	U.S. Pop Singles	U.S. Black Singles
1969	"In a Moment"	31	10
1970	"I'm Gonna Love You"	86	-
1971	"The Language of Love"	100	21
