= Oldsmobile Intrigue =

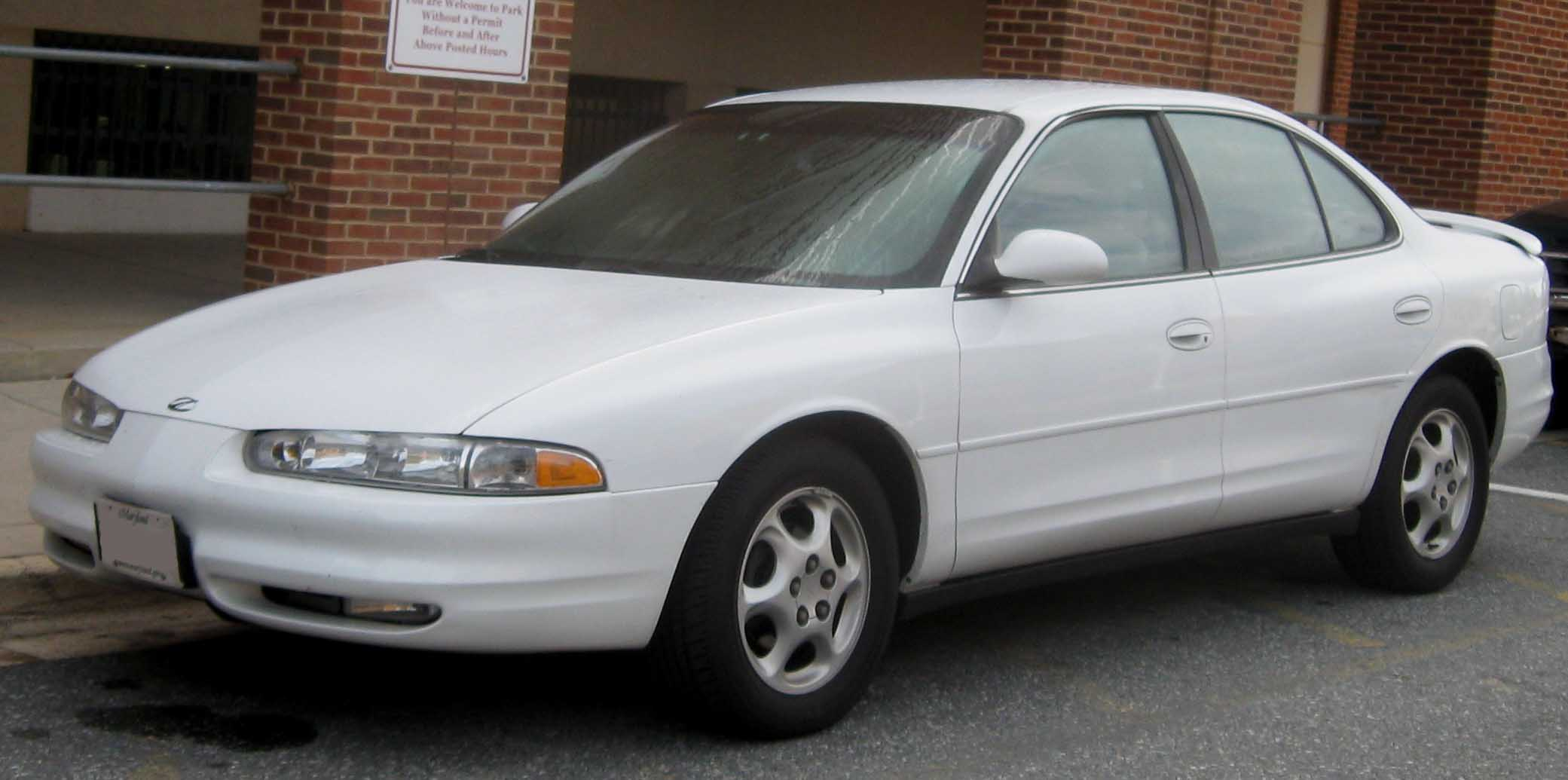

Overview
- Manufacturer: General Motors
- Production: May 5, 1997–June 14, 2002
- Model years: 1998–2002
- Assembly: United States: Kansas City, Kansas (Fairfax Assembly)
- Designer: Brigid O'Kane (1993); Pete Lawlis, interior

Body and chassis
- Class: Mid-size car
- Body style: 4-door sedan
- Layout: Transverse front-engine, front-wheel drive
- Platform: W-body 2nd Gen/GMX170
- Related: Buick Century; Buick Regal; Chevrolet Impala; Chevrolet Monte Carlo; Pontiac Grand Prix

Powertrain
- Engine: 3.8 L L36 OHV V6; 3.5 L LX5 DOHC V6
- Transmission: 4-speed 4T65-E automatic

Dimensions
- Wheelbase: 109.0 in (2,769 mm)
- Length: 195.9 in (4,976 mm)
- Width: 73.6 in (1,869 mm)
- Height: 56.6 in (1,438 mm)
- Curb weight: 3,455 lb (1,567 kg)

Chronology
- Predecessor: Oldsmobile Cutlass Supreme

The Oldsmobile Intrigue is a mid-size sedan that was manufactured from 1997 through 2002 by Oldsmobile. The Intrigue's design cues were first seen in 1995 with the Oldsmobile Antares concept car, being unveiled in production form in January 1996 at the North American International Auto Show. The Intrigue was the first casualty in the three-year phase-out process of Oldsmobile; Olds' remaining models would last an additional year or two.

The Oldsmobile Intrigue was introduced on May 5, 1997 as a 1998 model, and replaced the aging Oldsmobile Cutlass Supreme. It rode on the second-generation of the W-body, which it shared with the Buick Regal. The Oldsmobile Intrigue was supposed to compete with upscale Japanese and European imports such as Acura and BMW. The Oldsmobile Intrigue was heavily inspired by the Oldsmobile Aurora and the 1995 Oldsmobile Antares concept.

== History ==
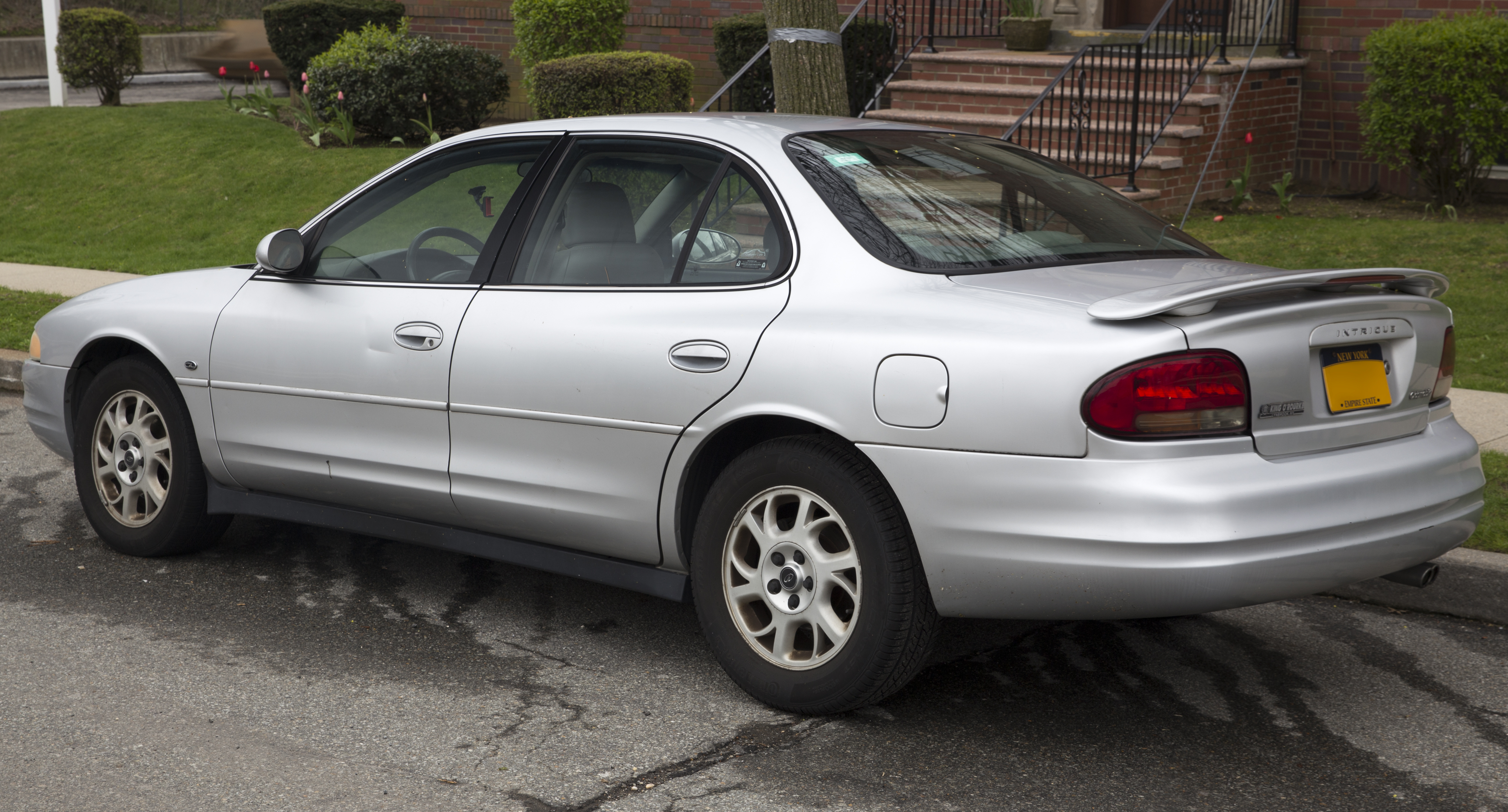
Oldsmobile Intrigue rear

The Intrigue was available in three trim levels: base GX, mid-level GL, and high-end GLS. All models were equipped with standard features such as V6 power, antilock brakes, 4-wheel independent suspension, dual front airbags, and full power accessories. GL trim included the addition of a 6-way power adjustable driver's seat, 6-speaker audio system, foglamps, and dual-zone automatic climate control. Top-line GLS added 6-way power front passenger seat, faux woodgrain interior trim, steering wheel audio controls, leather seating, full-function traction control, and a six-speaker Bose sound system.

All Intrigues were built at the GM Fairfax plant in Kansas City, Kansas, where the Grand Prix was also built (the Buick Century and Regal, and the Chevrolet Impala and Monte Carlo were all built in Oshawa, Ontario). For the 1999 model year, a new 3.5 L DOHC engine was introduced. It was a six-cylinder design based on Cadillac's Northstar V8, which was nicknamed the "Shortstar". The 3.5 L engine became standard for 2000, giving the Intrigue the most powerful standard engine of any W-body car.

Another exclusive was a standard 140 mph speedometer. With the Autobahn package the Intrigue came with larger 12-inch front brake rotors, being the first 2nd Gen W-body to incorporate bigger brakes. For 1998-99 models the Autobahn package consisted of a 3.29 differential ratio opposed to the standard 3.05, H-rated tires, 12-inch front brakes with ceramic pads, and a 128 mph speed limiter. For 2000 it was renamed Precision Sport Package which included everything from the Autobahn package except the larger 12-inch front brake rotors, and added the Precision Control System (also known as Vehicle Stability Control (VSC)). For 2002 the Intrigue Final 500 Collector’s Edition cars came in a unique Dark Cherry Metallic paint and featured Aurora-styled 17x7.5-inch chrome wheels.

On June 14, 2002, the final Intrigue rolled off the assembly line as part of the Final 500 Collectors Edition.

=== Year-to-year changes ===
- 1998: The Oldsmobile Intrigue was introduced as an all new model. Available in GX (base), GL, and GLS trim, all featured the 3.8 L V6 and 4-speed automatic transmission standard.
- 1999: For the beginning of this model year, the DOHC 3.5 L "Shortstar" engine was standard in the top-line GLS and optional on mid-level GL and base GX models. Early GLS models could be ordered with the 3.8L instead of the standard (for GLS) 3.5 L, but later on the 3.8 L was phased out and the 3.5 L became standard on all models. Decklids now wore a small Oldsmobile badge. In the previous model year, there was a complaint that some people couldn't tell that Intrigues were Oldsmobiles. If you look closely, you can read 'Oldsmobile' molded in the backup light lens in the taillight housing on all model years. All models now got a thicker, leather-wrapped steering wheel. An integrated rear radio antenna was standard this year and after.
- 2000: New wheels featured a fancier six-spoke design. New to the option list for 2000 was an antiskid system called the Precision Control System. Precision Control System was designed to help keep the car on its intended path by selective braking of one or more individual wheels. Though optional on all models, GX buyers had to order optional traction control to get the new antiskid system. Heated power front seats were now standard on GLS models. Standard leather door inserts trim not cloth, Retained accessory power was standard this year. "Oldsmobile" emblem on deck lid is larger than on 1999 models, although some early 2000 models carried the smaller version. A new gold-trim package was also available. New automatic headlights were now standard on all models.
- 2001: On GX models, traction control became standard instead of optional. Premium Leather and Precision Sport option packages were also available for this year. OnStar is now available as an optional feature.
- 2002: GLS models now featured a two-tone interior with sterling accents, as well as standard HomeLink, sunroof, and driver lumbar. All models featured new family of radios with RDS and standard CD player (borrowed from the newly redesigned Aurora). Tropic Teal and Indigo Blue were two new exterior colors. All models had new LATCH (Lower Anchor and Top tether for Children) in three rear seat positions. Sun & Sound package was available on GL models (includes Bose sound system and sunroof). New winchester headliner was inside. Production of the Intrigue ended in June 2002 as part of the phaseout of the Oldsmobile brand. The Final 500 Collectors Edition versions came in a unique Dark Cherry Metallic paint with special classic-style Oldsmobile emblems and featured Aurora-styled 17-inch chrome wheels. Owners also received a special commemorative packet.

Final 500 #499 was the last retail model and was special-ordered by a member of the Southern California Chapter of the Oldsmobile Club of America.

=== One-off variants ===
- Intrigue 442 (1999) - A customized Intrigue wearing a body kit similar in design to the Oldsmobile 442, much like the Alero 442 show cars. It debuted at the 1999 SEMA show. It is painted in Pearl White and Gold for a Hurst style motif. It rides on custom 6 spoke rims. The Intrigue sports 6 Oldsmobile Tilted Rocket logos on its body: two on the front bumper below the turn signal lamps, two on the rear bumper below the corners of the rear fenders, and two small ones on the driver and front passenger doors. These door logos also sport '442' text in a brighter white to contrast against the car's main body color. The logos on the doors are also embroidered into the headrests of the front seats, and is featured prominently on the engine cover. In total, the Intrigue 442 features 9 Tilted Rocket logos (11 if the standard bumper badge and steering wheel logo are counted). On the windshield is a sunstrip with 'GM SEMA PROTOTYPE THE LAST OLDS 442 BUILT' printed in white text. It is powered by a 550hp Cadillac Northstar V8. The Intrigue 442 was sold at the Barrett-Jackson Scottsdale 2009 auction, and again at the Mecum Auction in 2022.
- Intrigue OSV (1999) - A custom Intrigue created as part of "Oldsmobile Specialty Vehicles", an experiment in an aftermarket tuning brand for Oldsmobile. It debuted at the 1999 SEMA show. It features an Eaton supercharger fitted to its engine, raising its horsepower to 260, 13" cross drilled Brembo brakes hidden behind custom 19" RH Evolution C6 wheels with Oldsmobile center caps and fitted with Michelin Pilot XGT Z4 tires, Koni oilover struts and springs, Borla center exit exhausts, an aggressive body kit, and OSV fender badges, and is painted in a special cherry red paint, like the OSV Alero and OSV Silhouette. Inside, the OSV Intrigue is trimmed in red, gray, and beige leather, and features custom 8-positioned, climate-controlled Recaro seats with OSV-upholstered headrests, two-tone leather wrapped steering wheel, and titanium pedals. Standard features on the OSV Intrigue are: power windows/locks/steering/sunroof, cruise control, and a Delco AM/FM CD/Cassette stereo. It was sold at the Barrett-Jackson Palm Beach 2009 auction, and again in 2019 by Pinmaniac in Jacksonville, Florida.
- Intrigue OSV II (2000) - Another Intrigue modified for OSV, this time painted in dark green. Little information exists on the Intrigue OSV II, but it appears largely the same as the 1999 Intrigue OSV. It is part of a second batch of OSVs alongside the Alero OSV II, and Silhouette OSV II. The engine used in this version of the Intrigue is the same V8 engine that came from the Aurora. The whereabouts of this OSV Intrigue are unknown.

== Engines ==
- 1998–1999 OHV 3.8 L L36 (231 in³) V6 195 hp at 5200 rpm, 220 lb·ft at 4000 rpm
- 1999–2002 DOHC 3.5 L LX5 (212 in³) V6 215 hp at 5600 rpm 234 lb·ft at 4400 rpm (according to the Intrigue's owner's manual)

== Sales ==
1997	23,460
1998	90,563
1999	90,057
2000	64,109
2001	39,395
2002	15,015
2003	789
2004	55

== In popular culture ==

- The Oldsmobile Intrigue is featured in several scenes and promotions for the 1998 film The X-Files: Fight the Future. As the model's launch coincided with the release of the film, its producers and GM's executives at the time felt the car's name and appearance fit with the aesthetic of the X-Files franchise. Their creative teams launched a national campaign which included an expo tour around "'alternative' venues such as decomissioned [sic] military bases and airplane hangars [throughout the United States]."
- The Oldsmobile Intrigue is also featured in at least 2 episodes of Season 6 of Stargate SG-1. 6x05 Nightwalkers, and again in 6x14 Smoke & Mirrors. Both times driven by Major Samantha Carter.
