= Intrigue (solitaire) =

Solitaire card game

Intrigue is a solitaire card game which is played using two decks of playing cards. It is similar to another solitaire game called Salic Law, but it also involves the queens and building in the foundations goes both ways.

== Rules ==
First, one queen is removed from the rest of the deck and placed on the layout as the base for the first tableau column.

As they become available, all fives and sixes are placed at the foundations above the queens. The fives are built down to Aces, then to Kings, while the sixes are built up to Jacks, all regardless of suit.

Over the first queen, the cards are dealt over it until another queen appears. This new queen becomes the base for a new tableau column and cards are dealt over it. This is repeated until all eight queens are uncovered and all cards are dealt.

During the dealing, all fives and sixes are immediately placed in the foundations and any card that be built on the foundations must be placed there.

Once all cards are dealt and all those that can be built in the foundations make their way there, building continues. The top card of each column is available for play on the foundations. A column containing only a queen is considered empty and any card can be placed on it. There is no building in the tableau.

The game is won when all cards are built on the foundations with the face cards on top.

== Variations ==
Below are harder variations of Intrigue:

- In Laggard Lady, the fives and sixes may not be moved faster than the queens. Therefore, for example, if there are five queens dealt so far, a sixth five or a sixth six must be dealt to the tableau.
- In Glencoe, each five and six must be placed over the queen of its respective suit. If the appropriate queen is not yet available at a time a five or six appears, that five or six must be dealt to the tableau. Glencoe was invented by Albert Morehead and Geoffrey Mott-Smith for their 1950 treatise on patience games.

In the closely related but much older game of Salic Law the foundations are only built upwards from Ace to Jack. When a King becomes exposed in the tableau it is permissible to transfer the end-card of a column to it as a temporary reserve; under this rule the game can often be completed successfully. Also closely related is Fairie Queen.

== See also ==
- Salic Law
- List of patiences and solitaires
- Glossary of patience and solitaire terms

== Bibliography ==
- Morehead, Albert H. & Mott-Smith, Geoffrey (1950). The Complete Book of Solitaire & Patience Games. New York: Longmans.
- Parlett, David (1979). The Penguin Book of Patience. London: Penguin.
- Parlett, David (1987). The Penguin Book of Card Games. London: Treasure Press. ISBN 1-85051-221-3
