= Buick Electra =

Full-size luxury car (1959–1990)

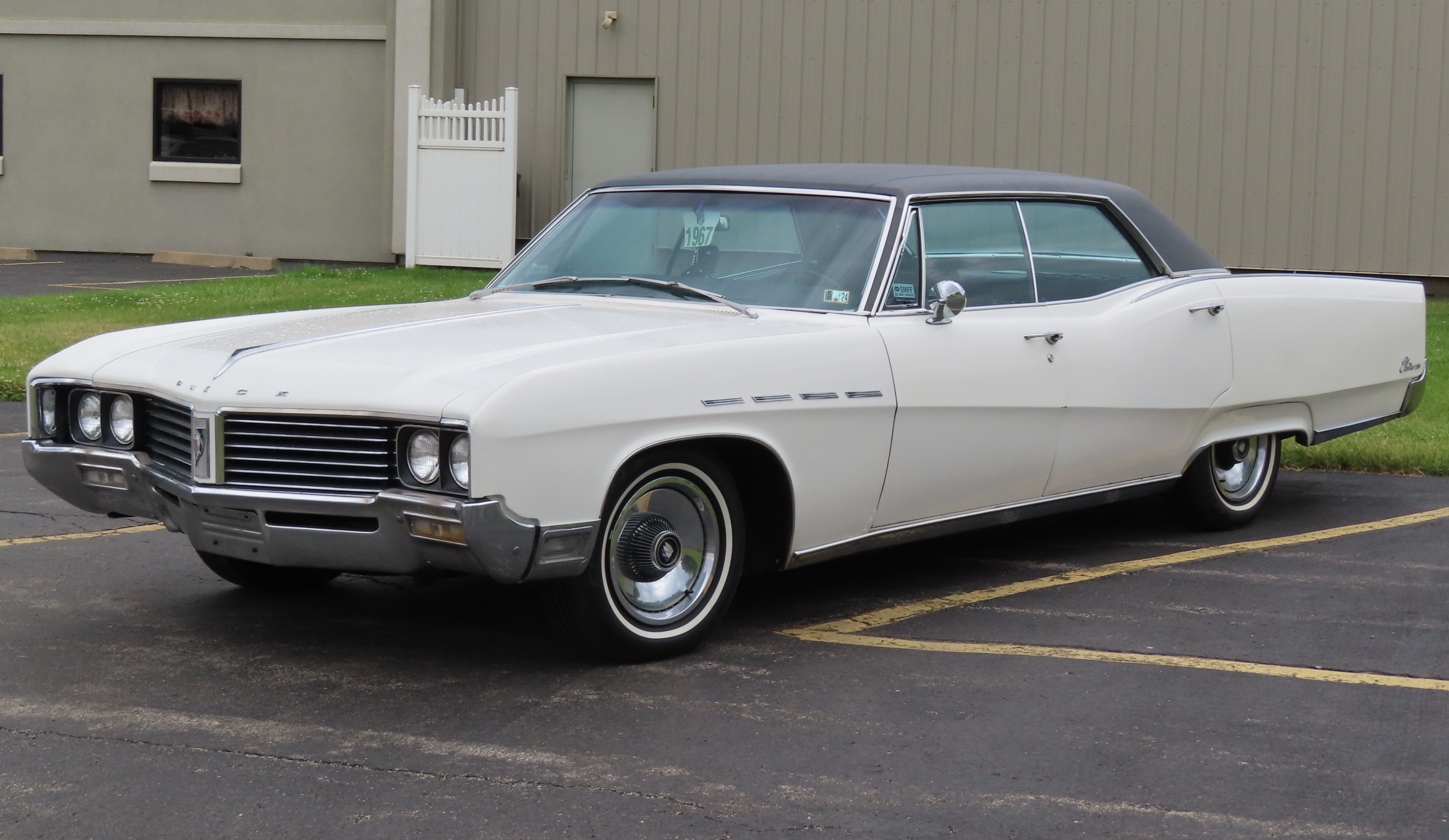
- 1967 Electra 225 Custom 4-door Hardtop

Overview
- Manufacturer: Buick (General Motors)
- Also called: Buick Electra 225
- Production: 1959–1990

Body and chassis
- Class: Full-size luxury car

Chronology
- Predecessor: Buick Roadmaster; Buick Limited
- Successor: Sedan – Buick Park Avenue; Wagon – Buick Roadmaster (1991–1996)

The Buick Electra is a full-size luxury car manufactured and marketed by Buick from 1959 to 1990, over six generations. Introduced as the replacement for the Roadmaster lines, the Electra served as the flagship Buick sedan line through its entire production, and was offered as a two-door sedan, two-door convertible, four-door sedan, and five-door station wagon.

The Electra initially used General Motors' rear-drive C Platform, undergoing a significant downsizing for 1977. For its sixth generation, introduced for the 1985 model year, the Electra underwent another significant downsizing, and adopted unibody construction as well as GM's new front wheel drive C Platform. Along with its rebadged variants, the Oldsmobile 98 and Cadillac Deville and Fleetwood, the Electra became GM's first full-size, unibody, transverse engine, front-drive car.

For 1991, Buick retired the Electra nameplate, migrating its front-drive premium sedan to the Buick Park Avenue nameplate, previously used as an upper trim level of the Electra itself. The Electra Estate was redesigned, becoming the Roadmaster Estate for 1991.

In late 2022, Buick announced plans to revive the Electra nameplate for its forthcoming 2024 electric models.

== Origin of name ==
The Buick Electra was named after Texas socialite and sculptor Electra Waggoner Biggs, sister-in-law of GM president Harlow H. Curtice. Also namesake of the Lockheed L-188 Electra airliner, Biggs owned a portion of the Waggoner Ranch (one of the largest ranches in Texas) and, as a sculptor, created busts of two US Presidents and other American figures.

== First generation (1959–1960) ==
First generation
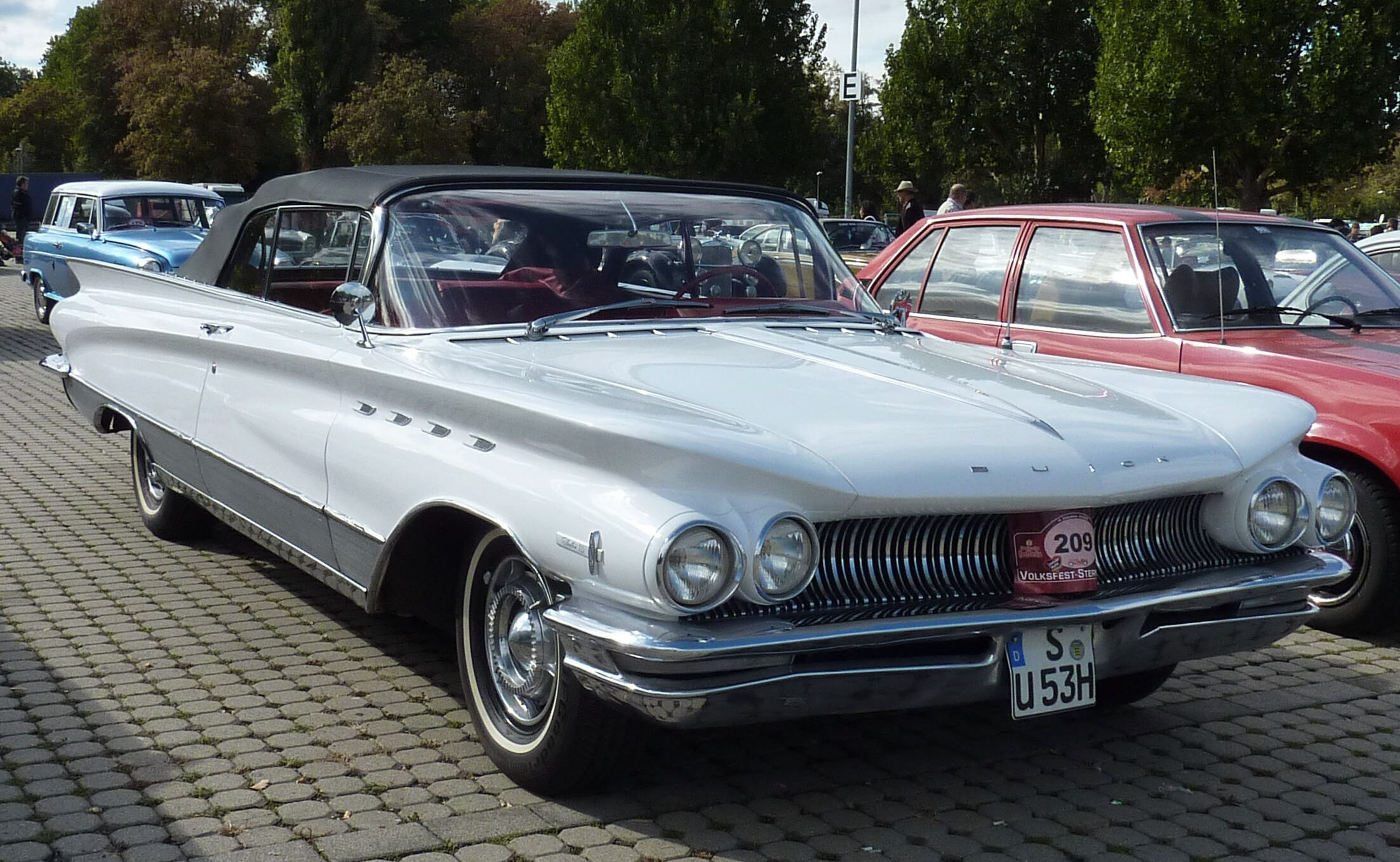
- 1960 Electra 225 convertible

Overview
- Model years: 1959–1960
- Assembly: United States: Flint, Michigan (Buick City); Arlington, Texas, U.S. (Arlington Assembly); Doraville, Georgia, U.S. (Doraville Assembly) "Atlanta"; Kansas City, Kansas, U.S. (Fairfax Assembly); Linden, New Jersey, U.S. (Linden Assembly); South Gate, California, U.S. (South Gate Assembly); Wilmington, Delaware, U.S. (Wilmington Assembly)
- Designer: Bill Mitchell

Body and chassis
- Body style: 4-door 4-window hardtop 4-door 6-window sedan Electra only: 2-door hardtop Electra 225 only: 2-door convertible 4-door 6-window Riviera hardtop 5-door 5-window ambulance trinity coach
- Layout: FR layout
- Platform: C-body
- Related: Cadillac Sixty Special; Cadillac De Ville; Cadillac Series 62; Oldsmobile 98

Powertrain
- Engine: 401 cu in (6.6 L) Nailhead V8
- Transmission: 2-speed Dynaflow automatic

Dimensions
- Wheelbase: 126.3 in (3,208 mm)
- Length: 1959: Electra 225: 225.4 in (5,725 mm); Electra: 220.9 in (5,611 mm); 1960: Electra 225: 225.9 in (5,738 mm); Electra: 221.2 in (5,618 mm)
- Width: 80.7 in (2,050 mm)
- Height: 55.9 in (1,420 mm)
- Curb weight: 4,700–4,900 lb (2,100–2,200 kg)

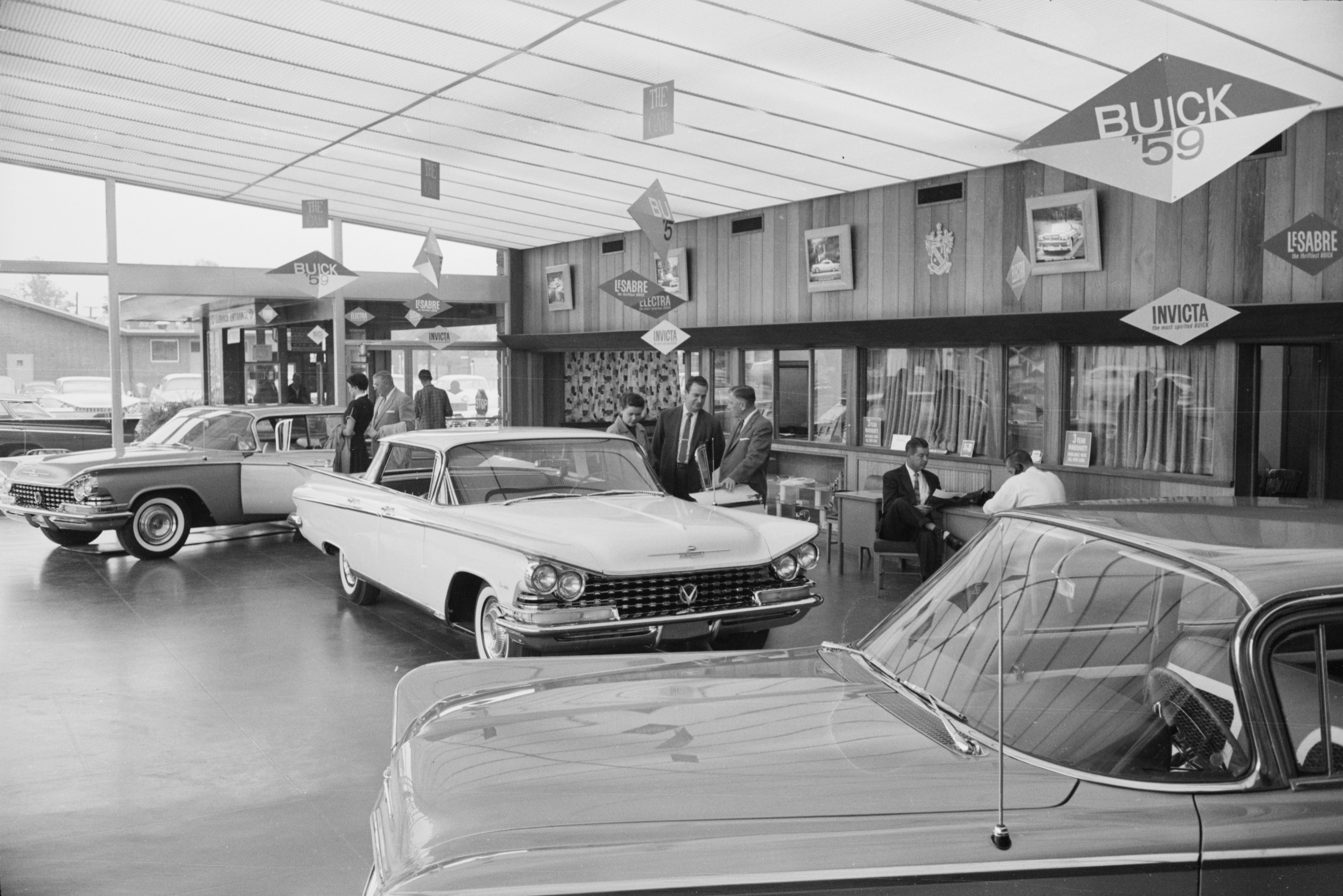
Electras on display at a car dealership in Washington, D.C., 1958

Following World War II, the Roadmaster constituted the upper echelon of Buick's lineup. For 1958, Buick returned the Limited nameplate (which had been dormant since 1942), slotted between the Roadmaster and the Cadillac Series 62.

For 1959, the Super was renamed the Invicta, the Roadmaster was renamed the Electra and Electra 225, and the unsuccessful Limited model was discontinued. The appearance was shared with two other Buick models, the mid-level Invicta and the entry-level LeSabre. The Electra 225 nameplate was a nod to the car's overall length of over 225 in (5,715 mm), earning it the street name "deuce and a quarter".

The Electra 225 Riviera was the top-line model, and shared its six-window hardtop roofline exclusively with Cadillac (which offered it on all of its models). Buick first applied the "Riviera" name to a premium trimmed 2-door Roadmaster hardtop in the middle of the 1949 model year, and denoted all Buick hardtops Rivieras thereafter. Also, from 1950 through 1953, Buick made a premium trimmed, stretched wheelbase sedan, exclusively in the Roadmaster and Super lines, that was called Riviera. But 1959 was the first year that not all Buick hardtops were called Rivieras. A standard 4-window four-door hardtop was also available, as was a 4-door 6-window pillared sedan, along with a stripped chassis of which 144 were built in 1959 and 1960. The two-door convertible was only available as an Electra 225, and the 2-door hardtop as an Electra.

For 1959, the Electra and Electra 225 both used the General Motors C-body shared with the Oldsmobile 98 and all Cadillacs, riding on a longer 126.3-inch (3,210 mm) wheelbase than the B-body LeSabre and Invicta, both of which rode on 123 inches (3,100 mm). The standard and only available engine was the 401 cubic-inch Wildcat V8 with four-barrel carburetor, 10.25 to 1 compression ratio and 325 horsepower (242 kW) mated to a two-speed Dynaflow automatic transmission, which was also standard equipment along with power steering and power brakes using Buick's unique 12-inch (300 mm) finned aluminum brake drums. Power windows and seat and leather interiors were standard on the Electra 225 convertible and optional on all other models. Front bucket seats were optional on the convertible. Electra interiors were trimmed in nylon Mojave cloth or broadcloth combinations with "Cordaveen". Electra 225 convertibles were trimmed in leather. Standard Electra features included horizontal Red-line speedometer, two-speed electric windshield wipers, trip mileage indicator, cigar lighter, dual sunshades, Step-On parking brake, dual horns, Twin-Turbine automatic transmission, Foamtex seat cushions, electric clock, trunk light, glovebox light, power steering, power brakes, full wheelcovers and dual exhaust. In addition Electra 225s had Super Deluxe wheelcovers and an outside rearview mirror as standard equipment. Padded dashboards were also standard. The Electra, along with all other 1959 Buicks, featured all new styling not shared with other GM divisions that included slanted headlights in front along with a highly chromed square grille somewhat similar to the 1958 Buick and "Delta-Fins" back along with round taillights. The "slanted" headlights were also shared with the 1958–60 Lincoln Continental. Exterior distinction from other Buicks came from extra-wide moldings, with a massive Electra emblem on the front fender extension. The "Electra 225" script was found on the front fenders ahead of the wheelhouse. The 4-door models had a lower bright rear fender molding as well.

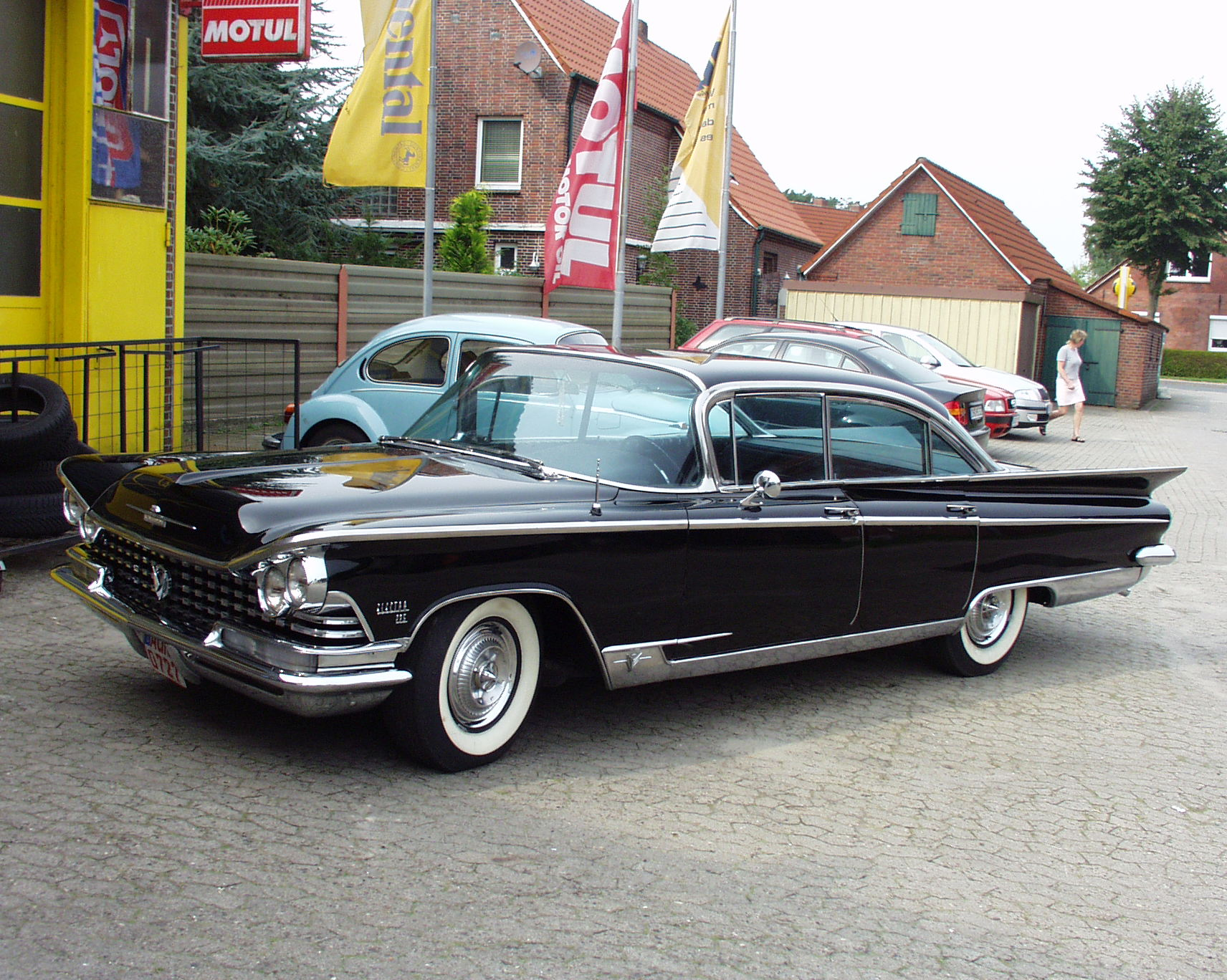
1959 Buick Electra 225 4-door 6-window Riviera hardtop

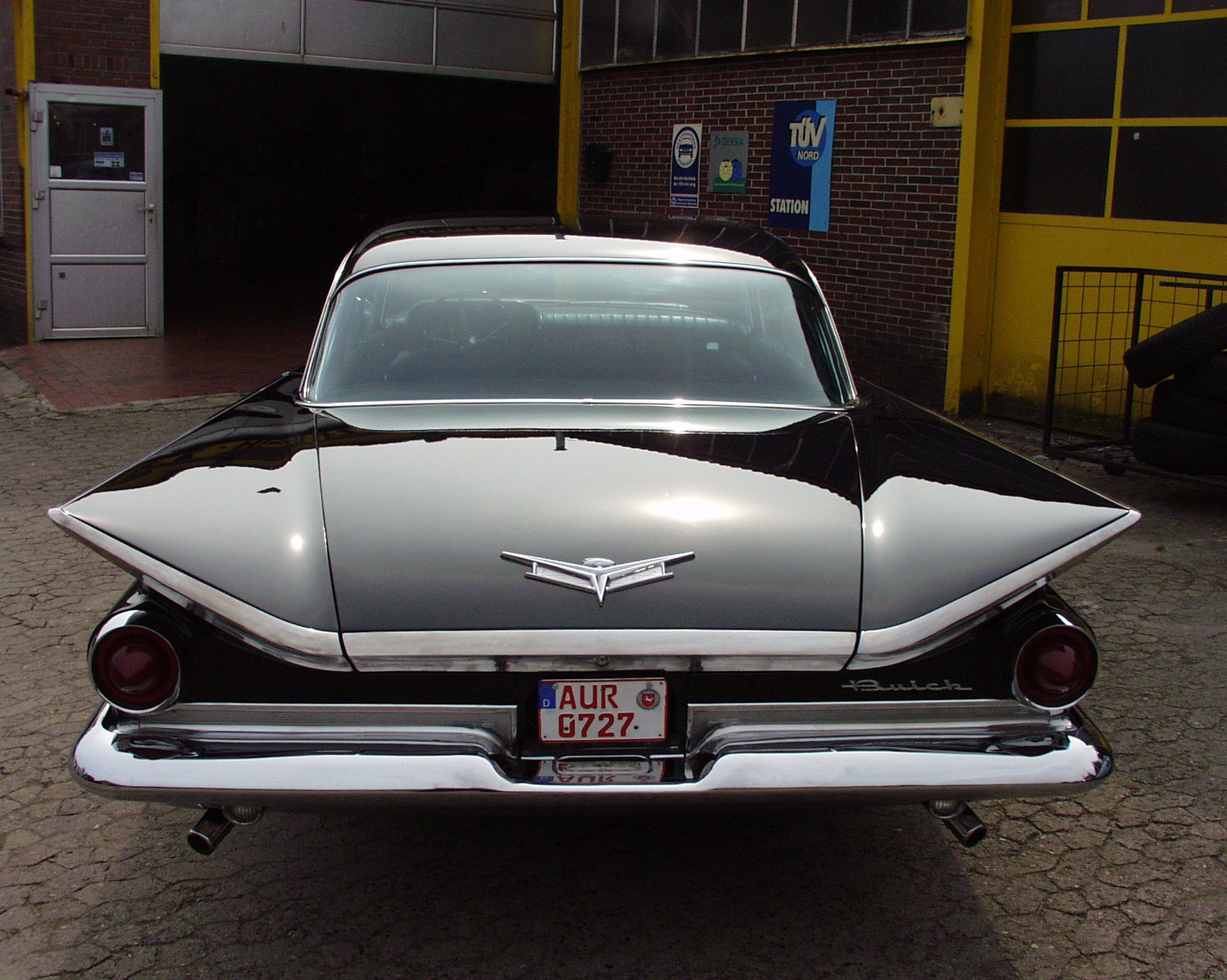
Delta Fins on a 1959 Buick Electra 225 4-door 6-window Riviera hardtop

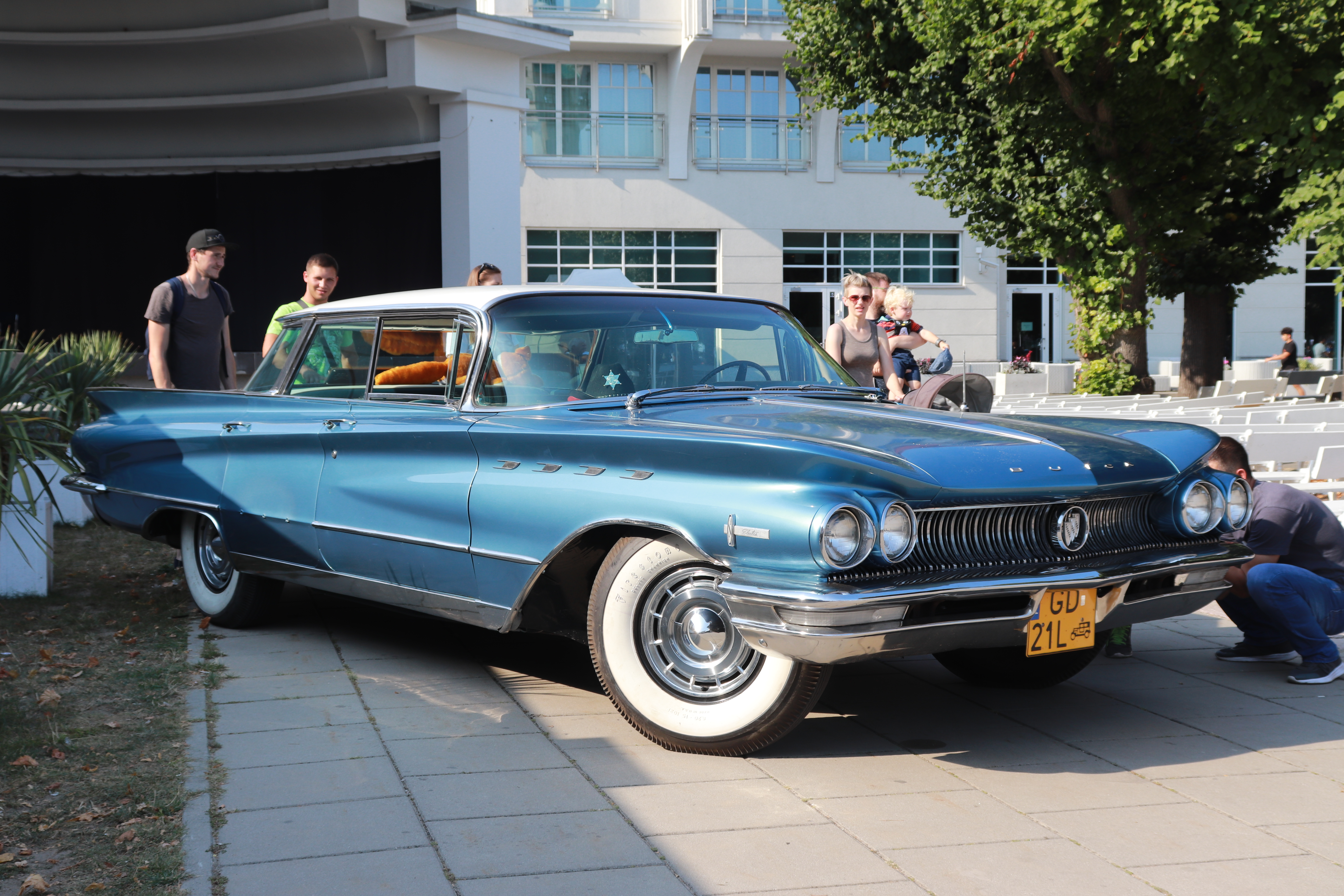
1960 Buick Electra 225 4-door, 4-window hardtop

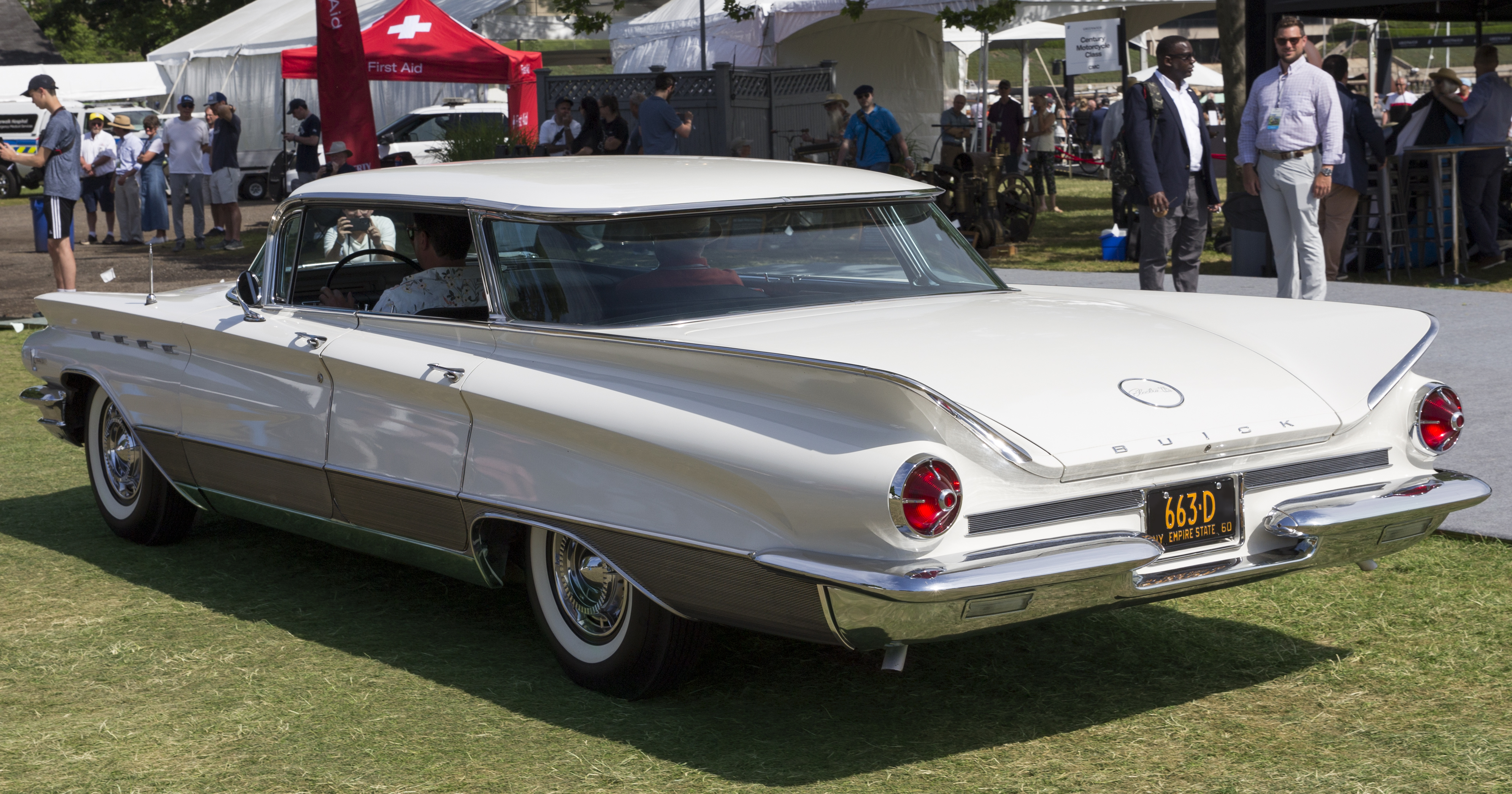
1960 Buick Electra 225 4-door, 4-window hardtop (rear view)

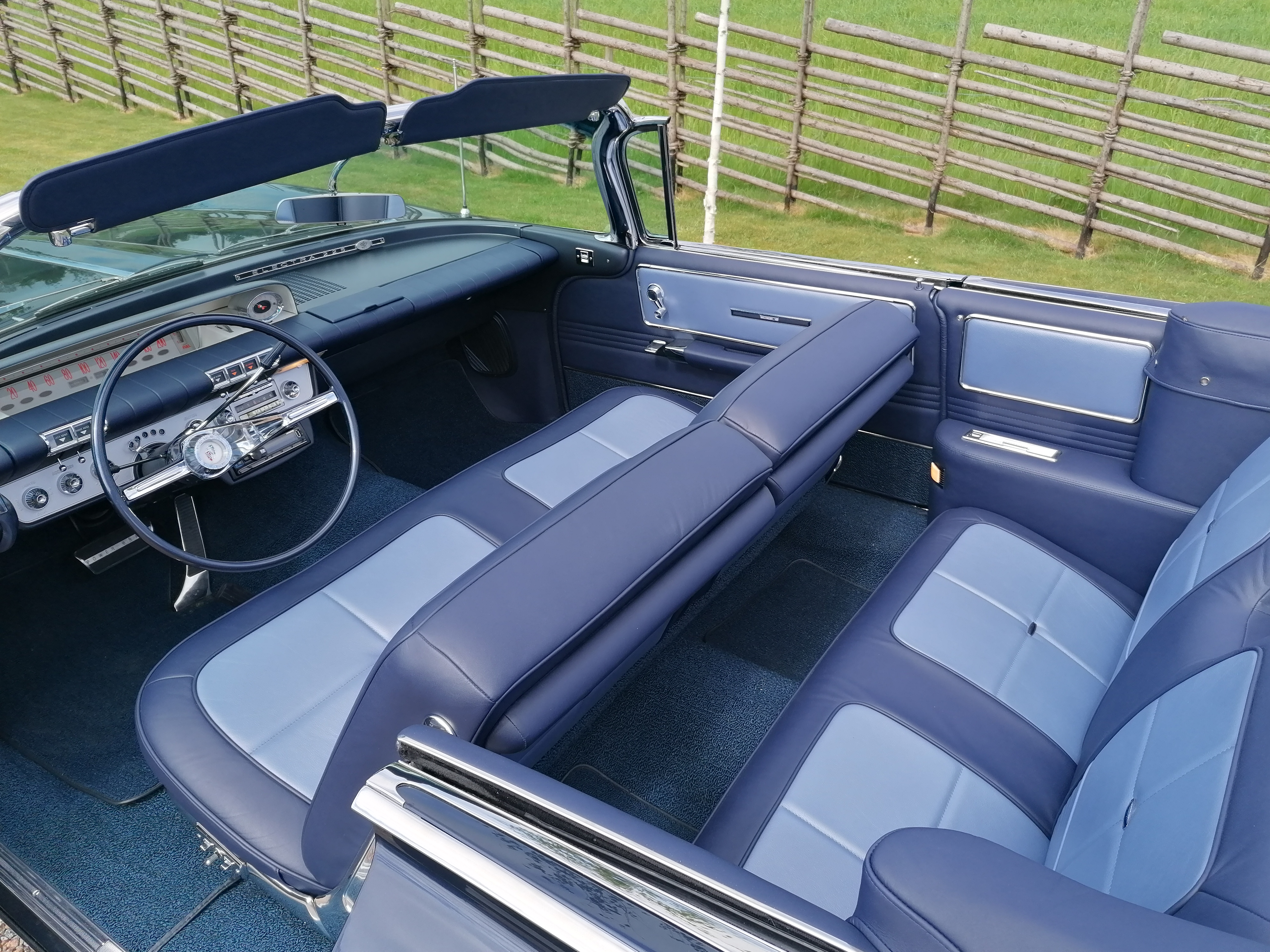
1960 Buick Electra 225 Convertible interior

The 1960 Electra and Electra 225 received a minor facelift with a concave grille and horizontal headlights centered by Buick's "Trishield" logo, which is still in use today. Reintroduced to Electras and other Buicks for 1960 were the chrome VentiPorts, first introduced in 1949 and last seen in 1957. Electra and Electra 225 models featured four VentiPorts on each front fender, while lesser LeSabre and Invicta models had three VentiPorts. Electras featured wider rocker panel bright moldings and the "Electra" script on the front fenders ahead of the wheelhouse. Electra 225s featured a badge that was circled on the deck lid. The "Electra 225" name was found on the front fenders in place of the Electra name.

Inside, a revised instrument panel featured "Mirromatic", where the speedometer, odometer, and any warning light indicators are reflected from an adjustable tilt mirror inside the dashboard for comfortable viewing that would reduce unwanted glare and reflection. A new two-spoke steering wheel with horn bars was introduced, replacing the time-honored horn ring then still common to most automobiles. Brisbane cloth interiors graced closed models while the convertible was trimmed in leather. Convertibles also had a two way power seat adjuster and power windows standard. The bucket seat option introduced on Electra 225 convertibles in 1959 was now available on Electra coupes, and included a center consolette with storage compartment. Standard Electra features included windshield wipers, trip mileage indicator, cigar lighter, dual sunshades, Step-On parking brake, dual horns, a single-key locking system, Twin-Turbine automatic transmission, Foamtex seat cushions, electric clock, trunk light, license plate frames, glovebox light, power steering and power brakes. In addition, Electra 225s had back-up lights, a glare-proof rear view mirror, parking brake signal light, safety buzzer, map light and Super Deluxe wheelcovers as standard equipment.

== Second generation (1961–1964) ==
Second generation
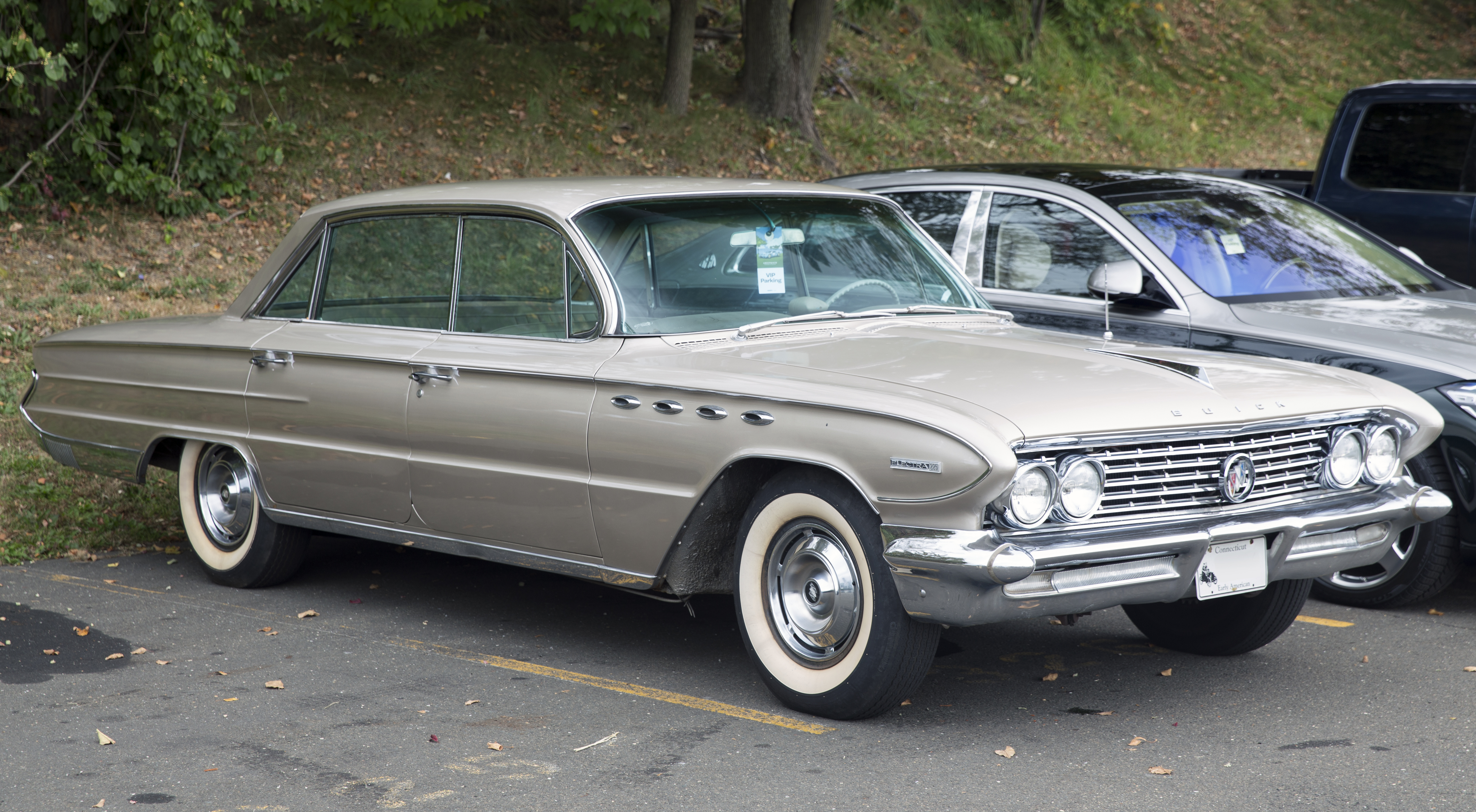
- 1961 Electra 225 Riviera pillarless sedan (6-window)

Overview
- Model years: 1961–1964
- Assembly: United States: Flint, Michigan (Buick City); Arlington, Texas, U.S. (Arlington Assembly); Doraville, Georgia, U.S. (Doraville Assembly) "Atlanta"; Kansas City, Kansas, U.S. (Fairfax Assembly); Linden, New Jersey, U.S. (Linden Assembly); South Gate, California, U.S. (South Gate Assembly); Wilmington, Delaware, U.S. (Wilmington Assembly)
- Designer: Bill Mitchell

Body and chassis
- Body style: 4-door 6-window sedan; 4-door 6-window pillarless sedan; 4-door 4-window hardtop sedan; 2-door hardtop coupe; 2-door convertible
- Layout: FR layout
- Platform: C-body
- Related: Cadillac Eldorado; Cadillac Sixty Special; Cadillac De Ville; Cadillac Series 62; Oldsmobile 98

Powertrain
- Engine: 401 cu in (6.6 L) Nailhead V8
- Transmission: 2-speed Dynaflow automatic 3-speed TH-400 automatic

Dimensions
- Wheelbase: 126.0 in (3,200 mm)
- Length: 1961: 219.2 in (5,568 mm); 1962: 220.1 in (5,591 mm); 1963: 221.7 in (5,631 mm); 1964: 222.8 in (5,659 mm)
- Width: 1961–62: 77.9 in (1,979 mm); 1963–64: 78.0 in (1,981 mm)
- Height: 1961: 57.0 in (1,448 mm); 1962–64: 57.5 in (1,460 mm)
- Curb weight: 4,300–4,600 lb (1,950–2,087 kg)

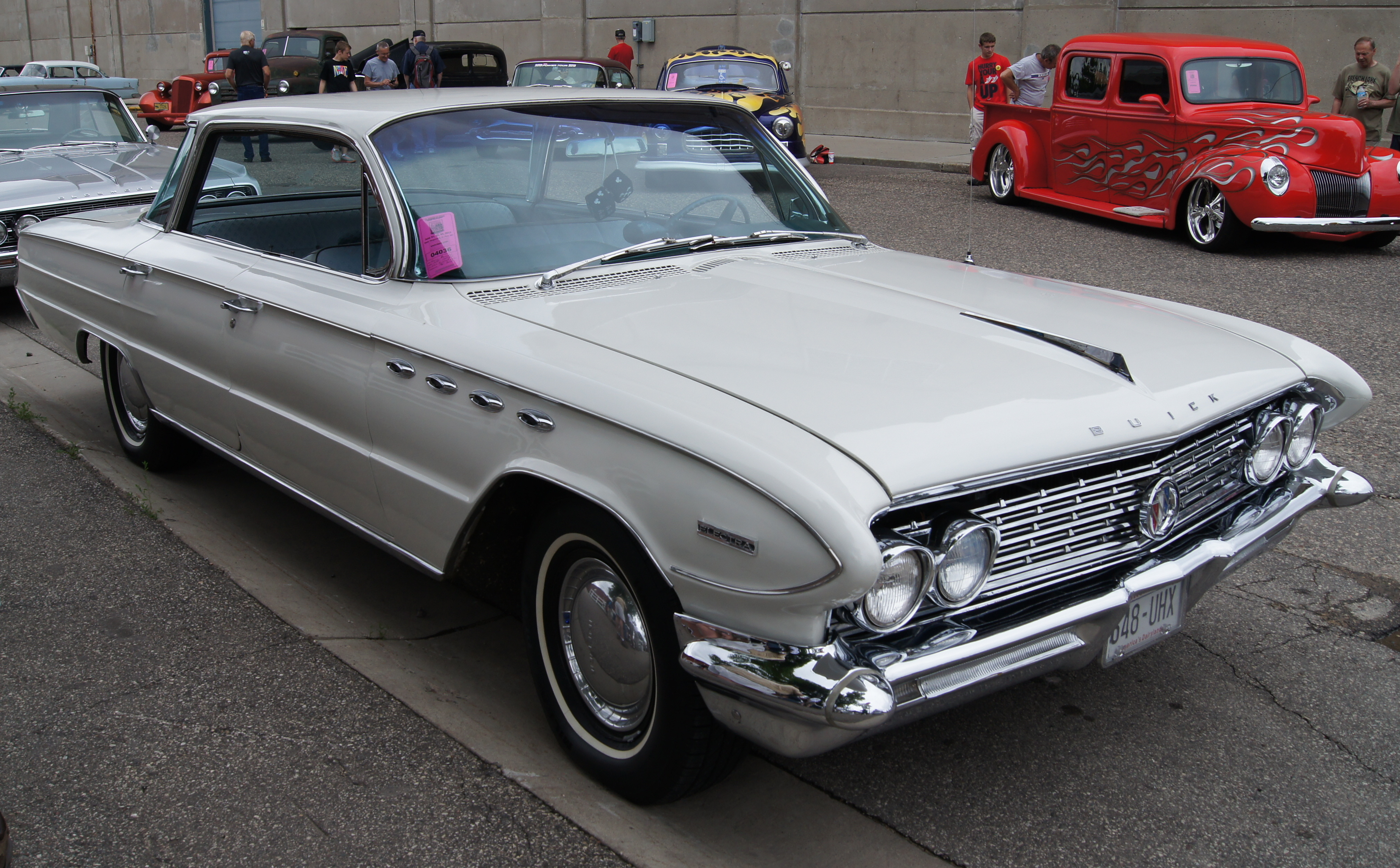
1961 Buick Electra 4-door hardtop sedan (4-window)

The Electra, along with the Invicta and LeSabre, was redesigned for 1961 with drastically shrunken fins, and was joined with the new compact-sized Skylark/Special. Electras featured bright rocker panel and wheelhouse moldings. Four VentiPorts per front fender were a hallmark, with identification spelled out on the front fender plaques. Electra 225s had four "hash marks" interrupting behind the wheelhouse of the rear fender. Electra 225 nameplates were found on the front fenders. Electra interiors were trimmed in fabric. Electra 225s were trimmed in Calais cloth or leather trim, except for convertibles which were trimmed in vinyl. An optional Custom interior featured leather trim, while another featured vinyl with contrasting vertical stripes and front bucket seats with a storage console and power two-way seat adjustment. Standard equipment on the Electra included Turbine-Drive automatic transmission, "Mirromatic" instrument panel, directional signals, full-flow oil filter, electric windshield wipers, Deluxe steering wheel, trip mileage indicator, cigar lighter, Step-On brake, dual armrests, cloth and vinyl trim, combinations, carpeting, power steering, power brakes, two-speed windshield wiper/washer system, glovebox light, Custom-padded seat cushions and Deluxe wheelcovers. Two-tone Electras had the color accent on the rear cove. In addition, Electra 225s had back-up lights, glare-proof rearview mirror, parking lights, signal light, safety buzzer, courtesy lights, two-way power seat, Super Deluxe wheelcovers with gold accents and power windows. The Electra and Electra 225 were the same length in 1961. Buick discontinued the Electra nameplate at the end of the 1961 model year, leaving only the Electra 225 starting in 1962.

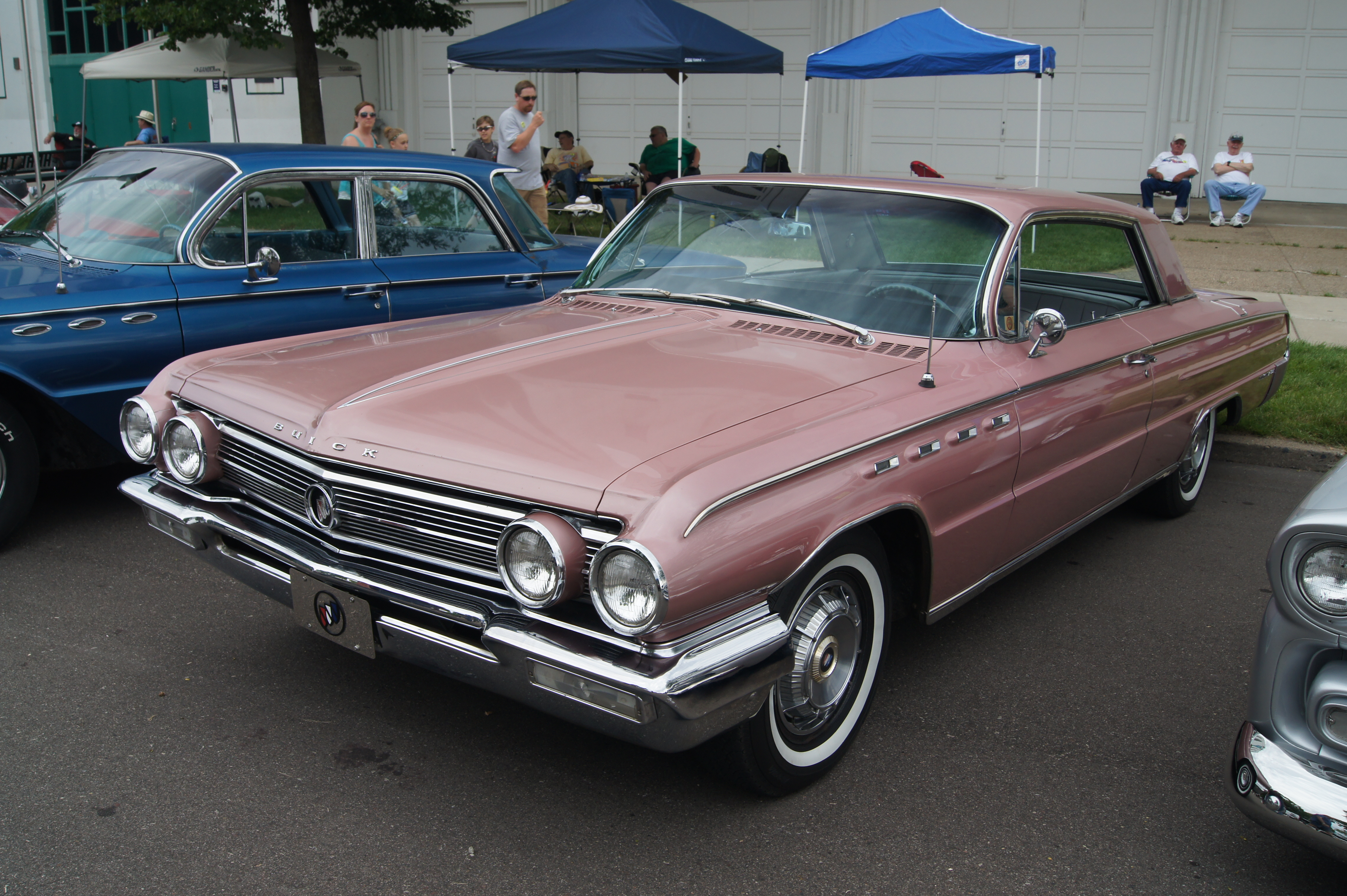
1962 Buick Electra 225 2-door hardtop

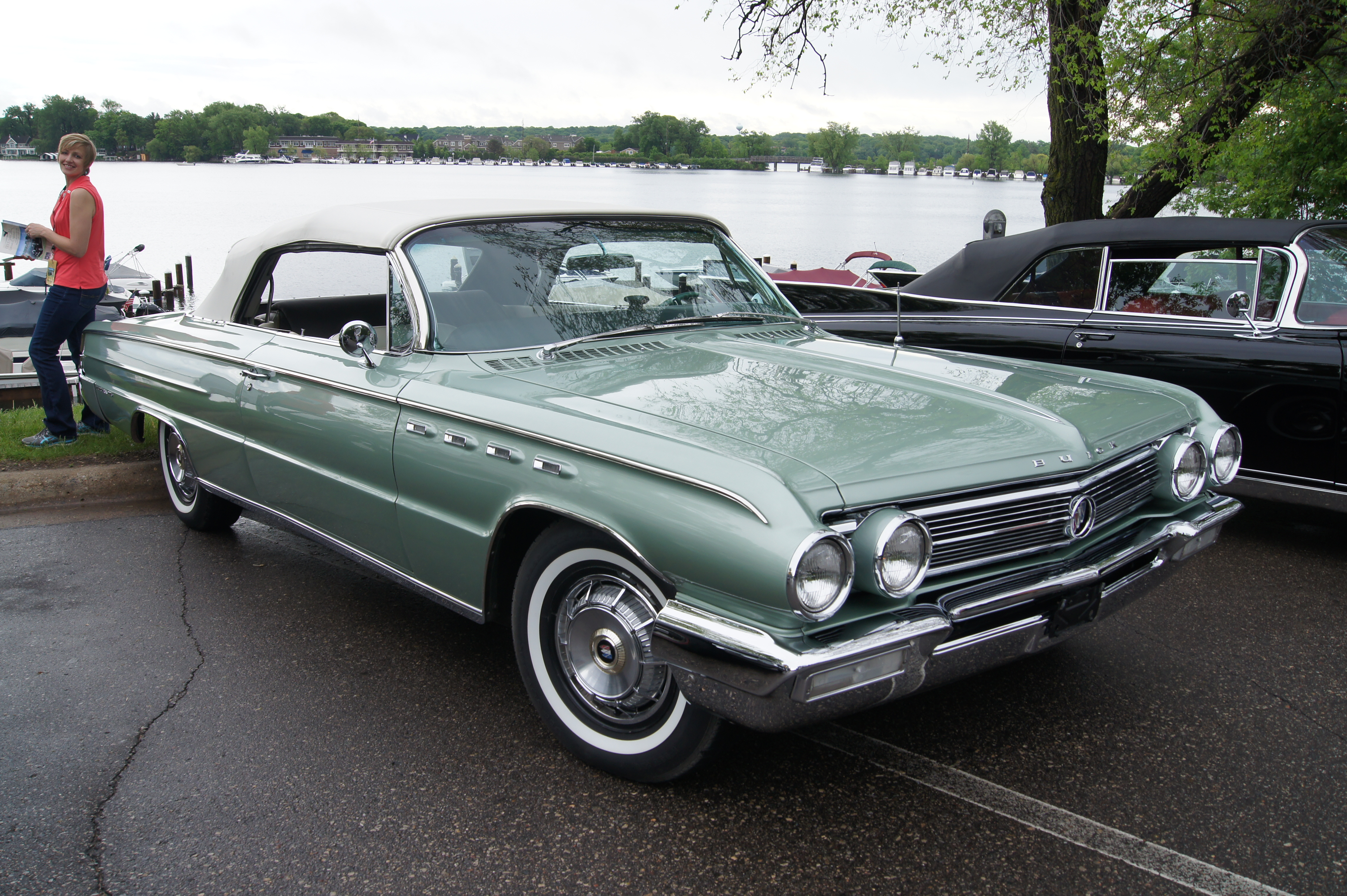
1962 Buick Electra 225 2-door convertible

The big Buick of 1962 carried four VentiPorts per front fender and featured a rakish sculptured restyle of its 1961 guise. The hardtop coupe and standard hardtop sedan featured a convertible-inspired semi-formal roofline, while the Riviera hardtop sedan continued to use six-window pillarless configuration. Electra 225 rear fenders had a group of vertical hashmarks, with "Electra 225" spelled out in block letters just above. A full-length bright strip crowned the upper body ridge, while the tower rocker molding and wheelhouses were accented with bright trim. Wheelcovers had a gold accent ring. Interiors were of the finest cloth, and leather was used on the convertible. Standard features included directional signals, full-flow oil filter, dual speed electric windshield washer/wipers, Deluxe steering wheel, cigar lighter, step-on parking brake, dual armrests, Turbine-Drive transmission, padded dashboard, heater, defroster, glovebox light, back-up lights, power steering, glare-proof rearview mirror, power brakes, power brake signal light, safety buzzer, courtesy lights, two-way power seats, power windows, Super Deluxe wheelcovers, safety option group, custom padded cushions, accessory group options and custom moldings.

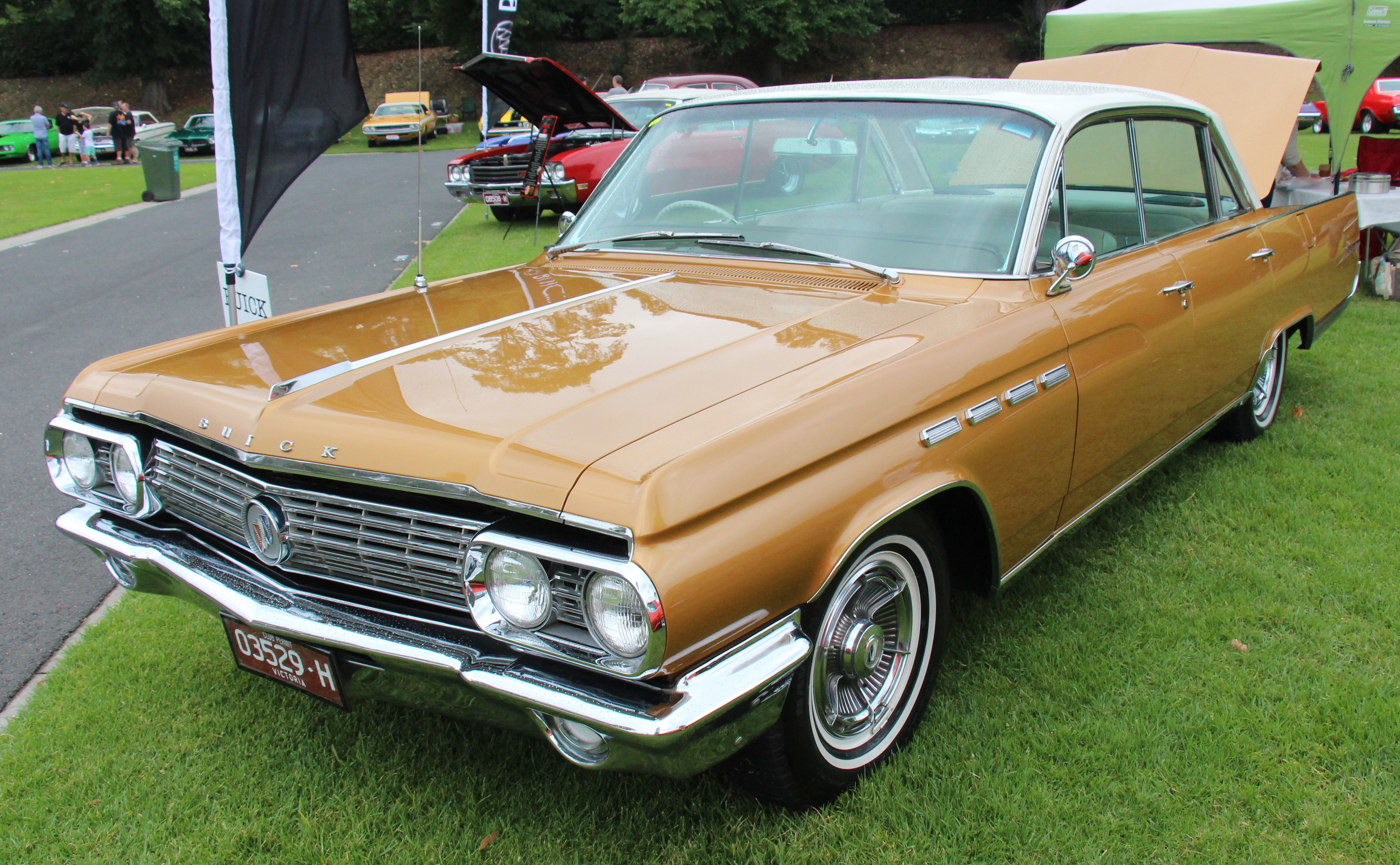
1963 Buick Electra 225 4-door sedan

Buick's largest, plushest, and most expensive models were restyled for 1963, with distinctive rear fenders culminating in a sharp vertical edge housing narrow back-up lights. The taillights were horizontally placed in the vertical deck cove. A unique cast grille was used at the front. Bright wheelhouse and lower body moldings, with ribbed rear fender panels were used. Red-filled Electra 225 badges were found on the rear fenders, while four VentiPorts lent status to the front fenders. Interiors were cloth and vinyl combinations, while a Custom interior in vinyl and leather, with front bucket seats and a storage console, was available for the convertible and sport coupe. Standard equipment included directional signals, full-flow oil filter, dual speed electric windshield wiper/washers, Deluxe steering wheel, cigar lighter, step-on parking brake, dual armrests, Turbine-Drive automatic transmission, padded dashboard, heater, defroster, glovebox light, back-up lights, power steering, glare-proof rearview mirror, power brakes, parking brake signal light, safety buzzer, courtesy lights, two-way power seats, power windows, Super Deluxe wheelcovers, safety option group, custom padded cushions, accessory group options and custom moldings. Buick dropped the Riviera name as a body style designation after the 1963 model year, shifting the Riviera name exclusively to Buick's new personal luxury coupe that had been introduced in 1963. Buick added a seven-way tilt steering wheel and a new cruise control as an option.

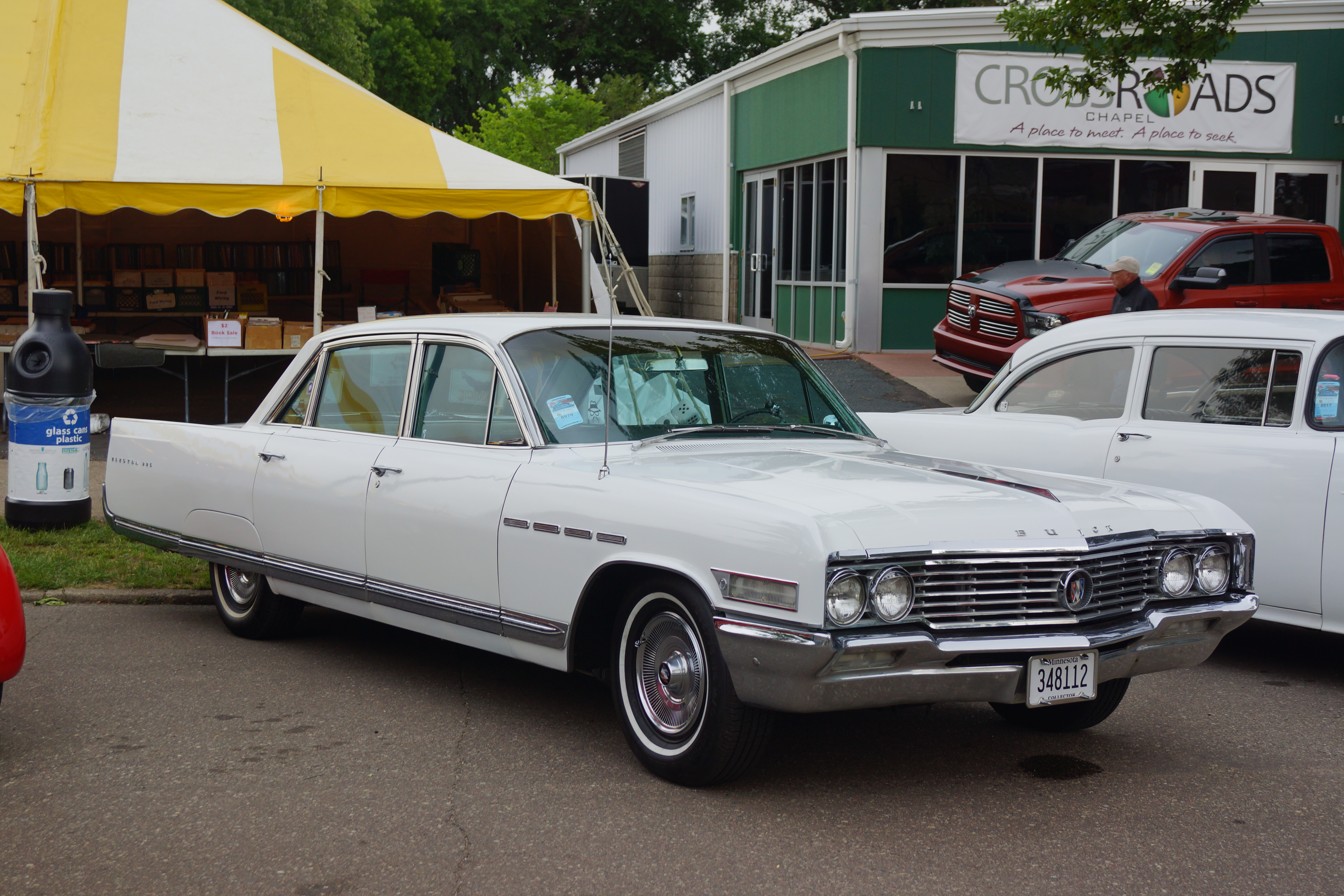
1964 Buick Electra 4-door pillared sedan (6-window)

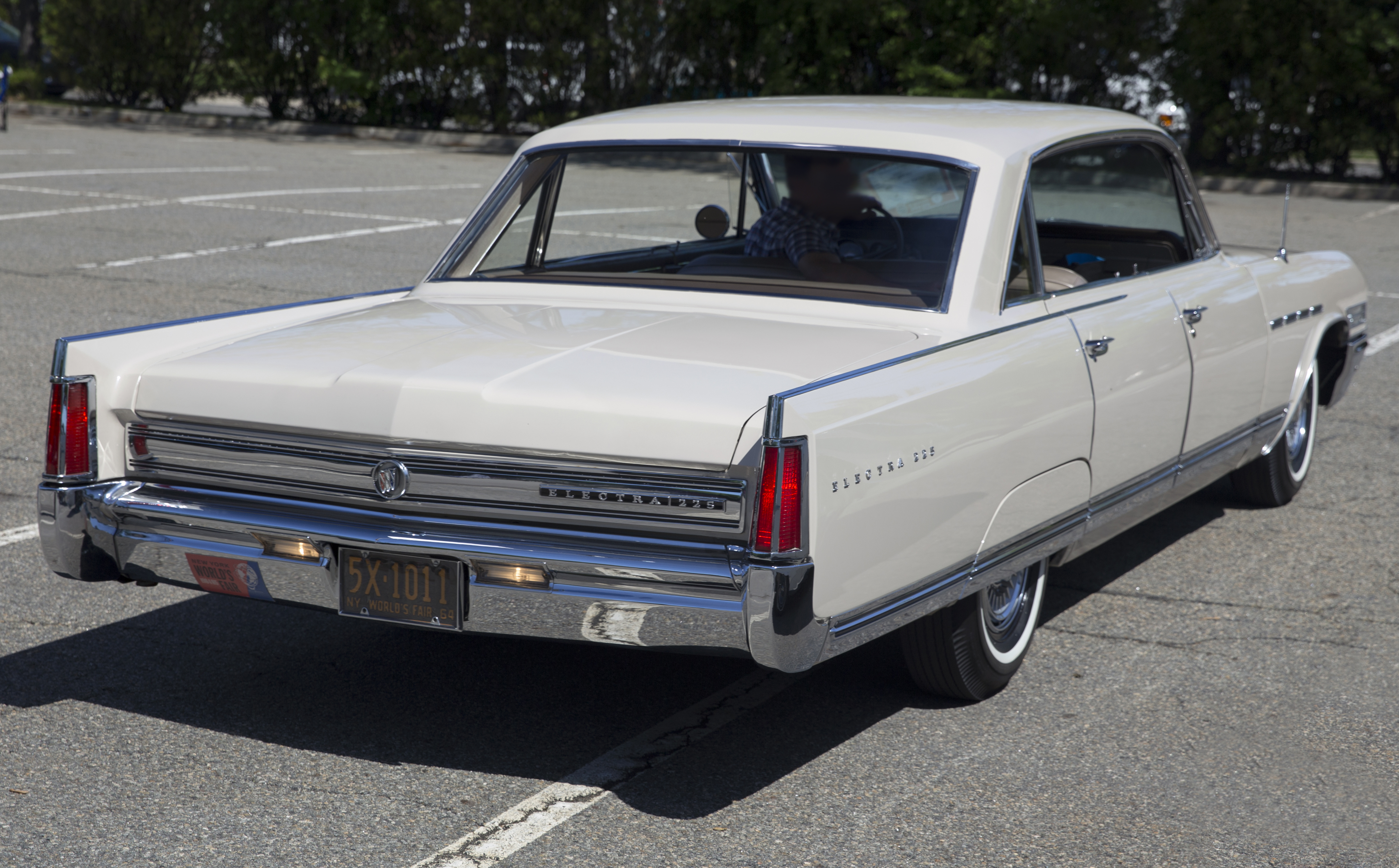
Rear view of 1964 Electra 225 4-door pillarless sedan (6-window)

The large GM C-body was used to create the 1964 Electra 225, Buick's richest full-size car. Vertical, narrow taillamps were found in the nearly straight-cut rear fender ends, and the so-called "Deuce-and-a Quarter" came with fender skirts. Four traditional VentiPorts were found on the front fenders, with heavy die-cast grille accenting the frontal aspect. Wide front lower body moldings were used along with a bright deck cove insert. "Electra 225" lettering was found on the rear fenders and specific full wheelcovers were featured. Vinyl and brocade cloth interior trims were found in closed models, while leather upholstery was offered for seats in the convertible. Among the Electra's exclusive standard equipment were power steering; power brakes; two-speed electric wipers with windshield washer; foam padded seats; electric clock; license frame; trunk light; two-way power seat and power windows for the convertible; safety buzzer; and additional courtesy lights. The two-speed Dynaflow automatic was replaced by the three-speed TH-400 as standard equipment.

== Third generation (1965–1970) ==
Third generation
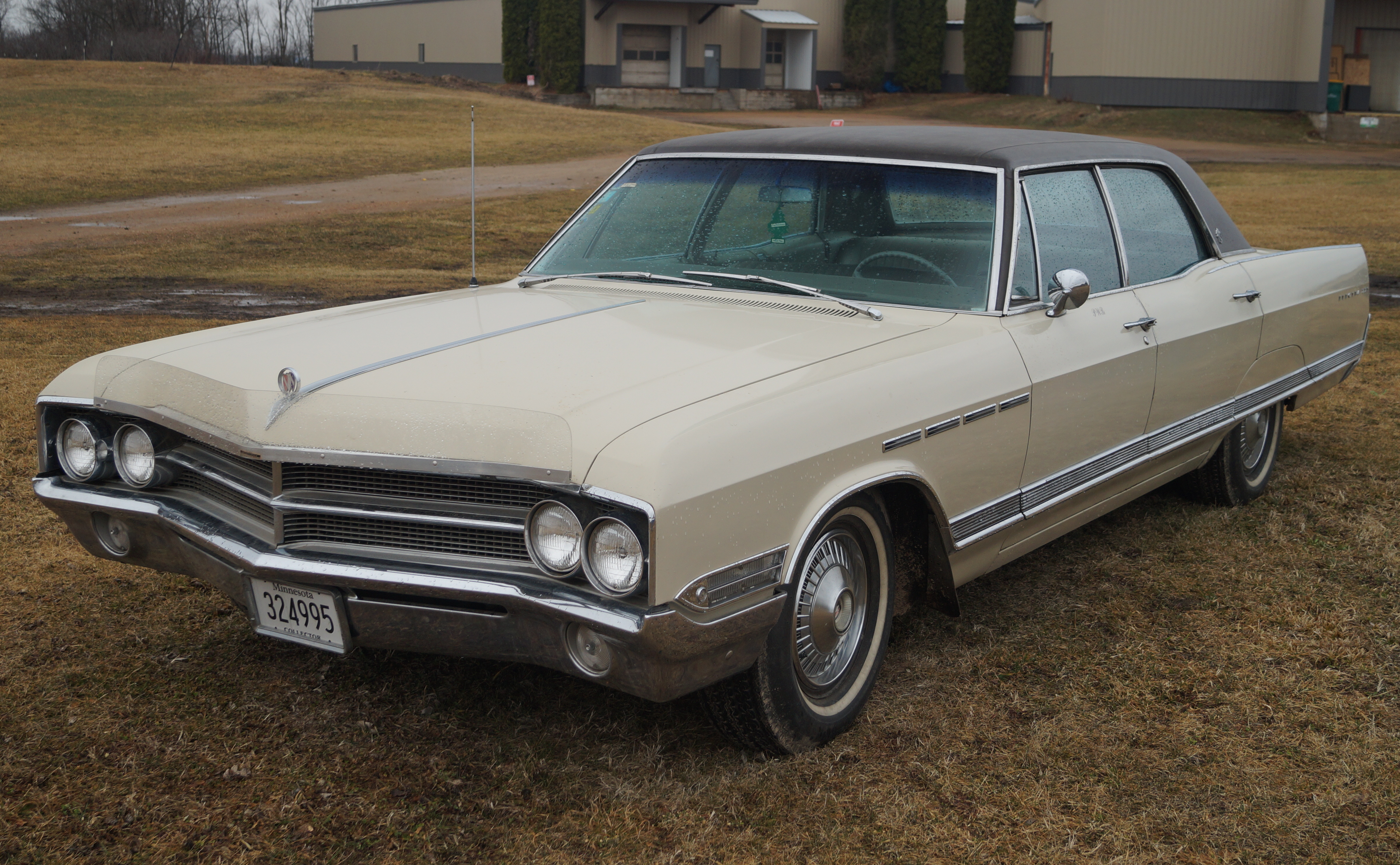
- 1965 Electra 225 sedan

Overview
- Model years: 1965–1970
- Assembly: United States: Flint, Michigan (Buick City)
- Designer: Bill Mitchell

Body and chassis
- Body style: 4-door hardtop 4-door sedan 2-door hardtop 2-door convertible
- Layout: FR layout
- Platform: C-body
- Related: Cadillac Eldorado; Cadillac De Ville; Cadillac Calais; Oldsmobile 98

Powertrain
- Engine: 401 cu in (6.6 L) Nailhead V8; 425 cu in (7.0 L) Nailhead V8; 430 cu in (7.0 L) Buick V8; 455 cu in (7.5 L) Buick V8
- Transmission: 3-speed TH-400 automatic

Dimensions
- Wheelbase: 1965–68: 126.0 in (3,200 mm); 1969–70: 127.0 in (3,226 mm)
- Length: 1965: 224.1 in (5,692 mm); 1966: 223.4 in (5,674 mm); 1967: 223.9 in (5,687 mm); 1968: 224.9 in (5,712 mm); 1969: 224.8 in (5,710 mm); 1970: 225.8 in (5,735 mm)
- Width: 80.0 in (2,032 mm)
- Height: 1965–66: 57.5 in (1,460 mm); 1967–68: 56.2 in (1,427 mm); 1969: 55.8 in (1,417 mm); 1970: 55.9 in (1,420 mm)

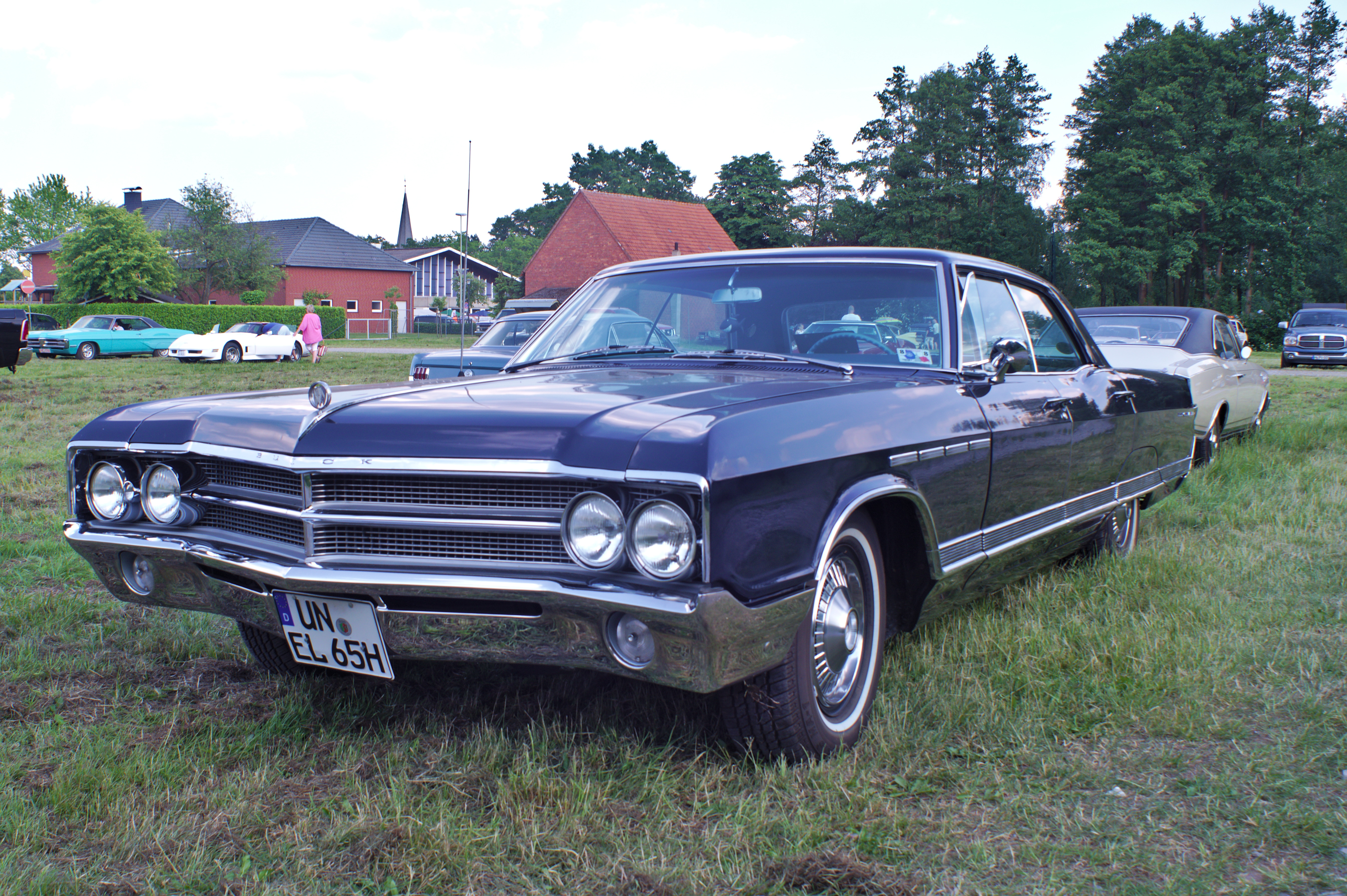
1965 Buick Electra 225 4-Door Hardtop

All GM passenger vehicles received a major redesign in 1965, dominated by flowing "Coke bottle" lines and fastback roof profiles on its coupe models, and the six-window body style was eliminated. For 1965, Buick also changed its marketing strategy, offering the Electra 225 in two trim levels, base and Custom. Along with the new body came a new chassis with a full perimeter frame including side rails that replaced the previous "X" frame used since 1961. Engine offerings were unchanged from 1964, including the standard 325 hp (242 kW) 401 V8, and two versions of the larger 425 V8 that were rated at 340 hp (254 kW) with a four-barrel carburetor or 360 hp (268 kW) with two four barrels. The three-speed Super Turbine 400 automatic transmission was standard equipment. A new body style introduced for 1965 was the thin-pillar 4-door sedan, which featured frameless window glass with a thin, chrome fixed "B" pillar.

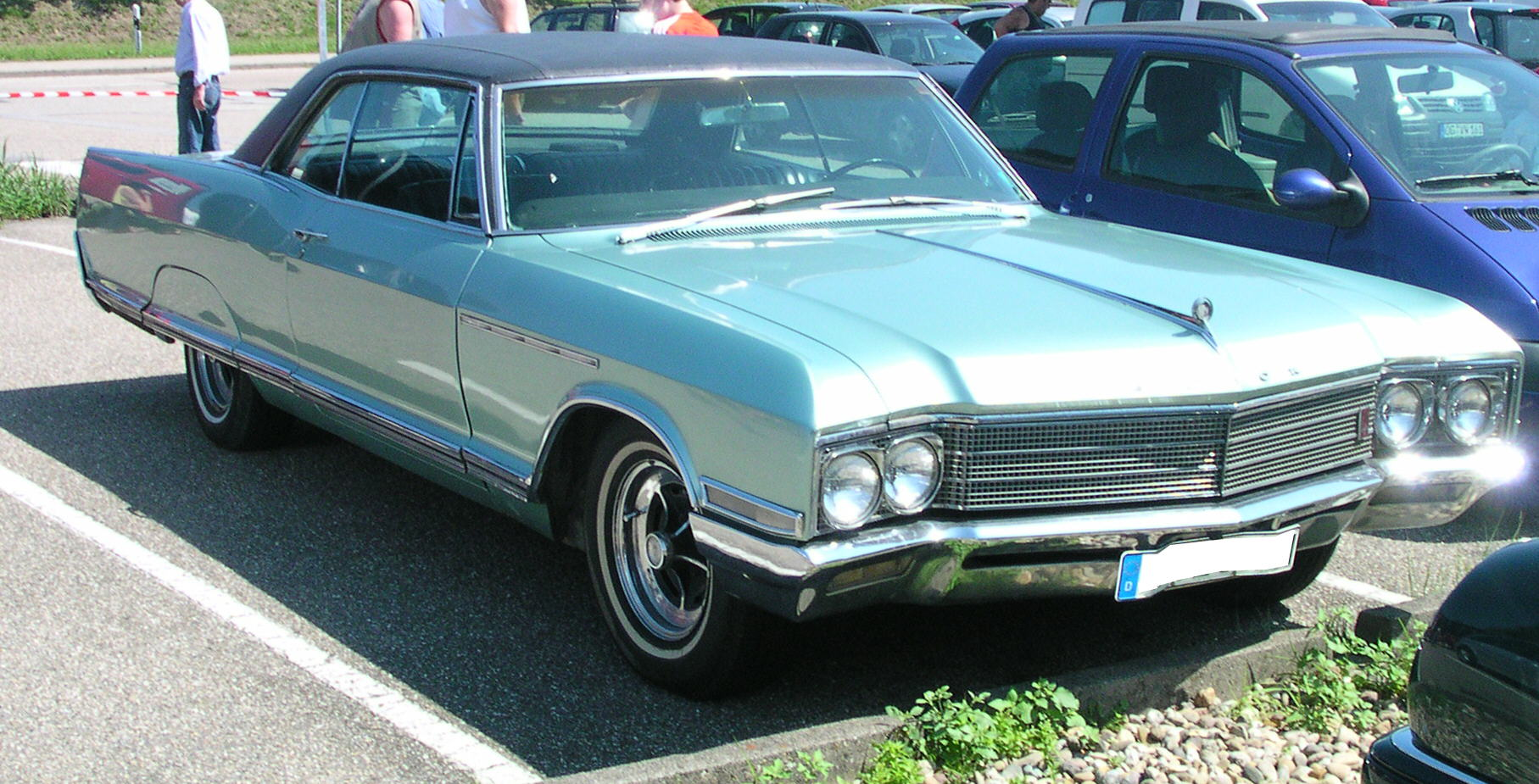
1966 Electra 225 2-door hardtop

The 1966 Electra 225 saw only minor styling changes, including a new grille and a revised full-width taillight and trunk lid that included an "Electra 225" script rather than the "Buick" nameplate spelled out in 1965. Engine offerings were unchanged from 1965 with the exception that the dual-quad 360 hp (268 kW) 425 was downgraded from a factory option to dealer-installed. Inside, a revised instrument panel featured a horizontal sweep speedometer, fuel gauge and warning lights. Front seat headrests became an option.

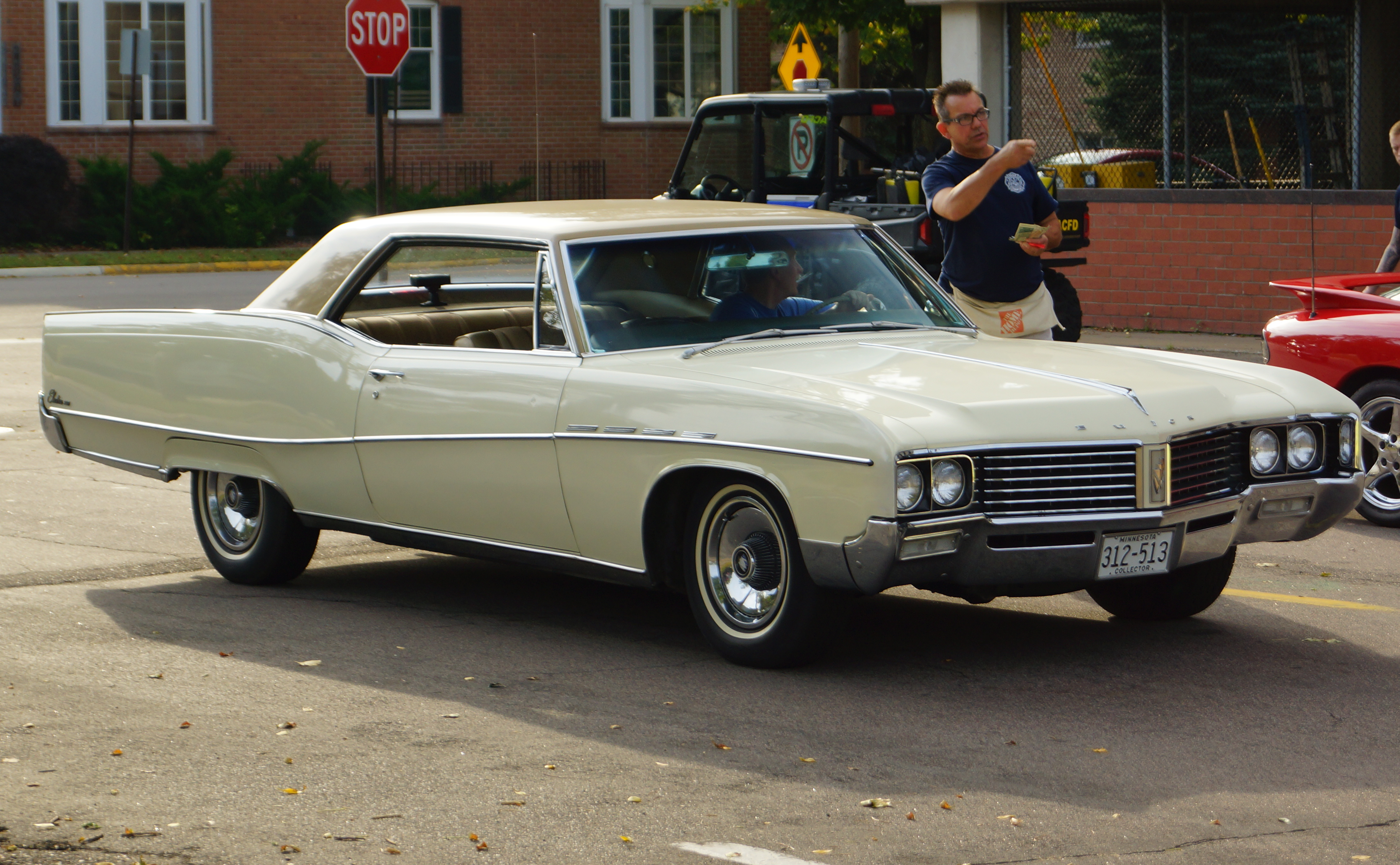
1967 Electra 225 2-door hardtop

A moderate facelift highlighted the 1967 Electra 225 including a Pontiac/Oldsmobile-like divided split grille. Both base and Custom models were continued with a new "Limited" option package available for the Electra 225 Custom 4-door hardtop, reviving a nameplate that graced Buick's ultra-luxury flagship in the late 1930s (and again in 1958), which included an ultra-luxurious interior trim. Under the hood, a new 430 cubic-inch V8 rated at 360 hp (268 kW) with four-barrel carburetor replaced the previous "Nailhead" 401 and 425 V8s. Power front disc brakes were available as a new option, along with a stereo 8-track tape player.

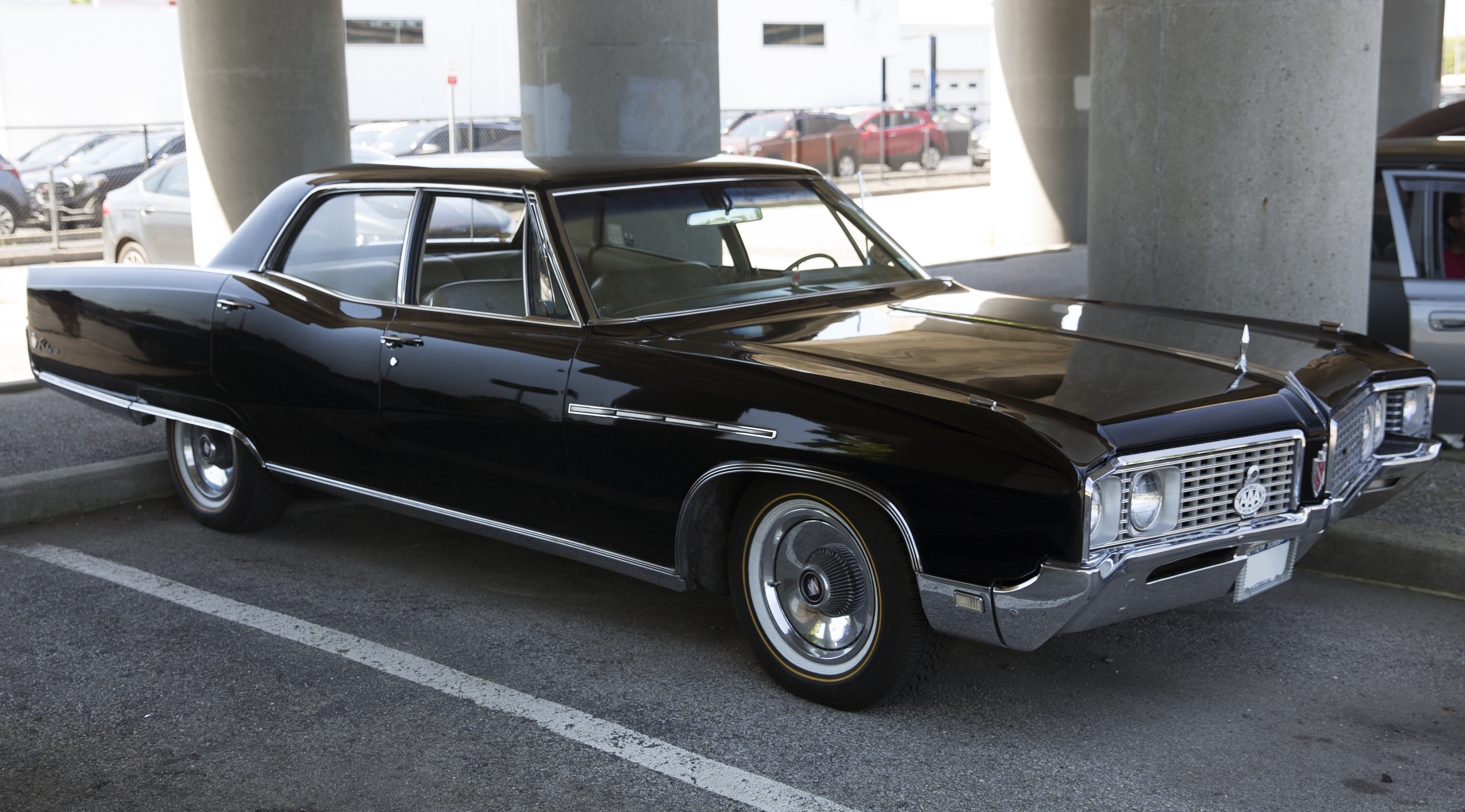
1968 Buck Electra 225 4-door sedan

The 1968 Electra 225 received a revised grille and taillight trim along with concealed windshield wipers. Inside, there was a revised instrument panel with a square speedometer and other instruments, plus a new steering wheel. Shoulder seatbelts were standard for both the driver and front passenger. Base and Custom models were still offered, with the Limited trim option available on the Electra 225 Custom hardtop sedan.

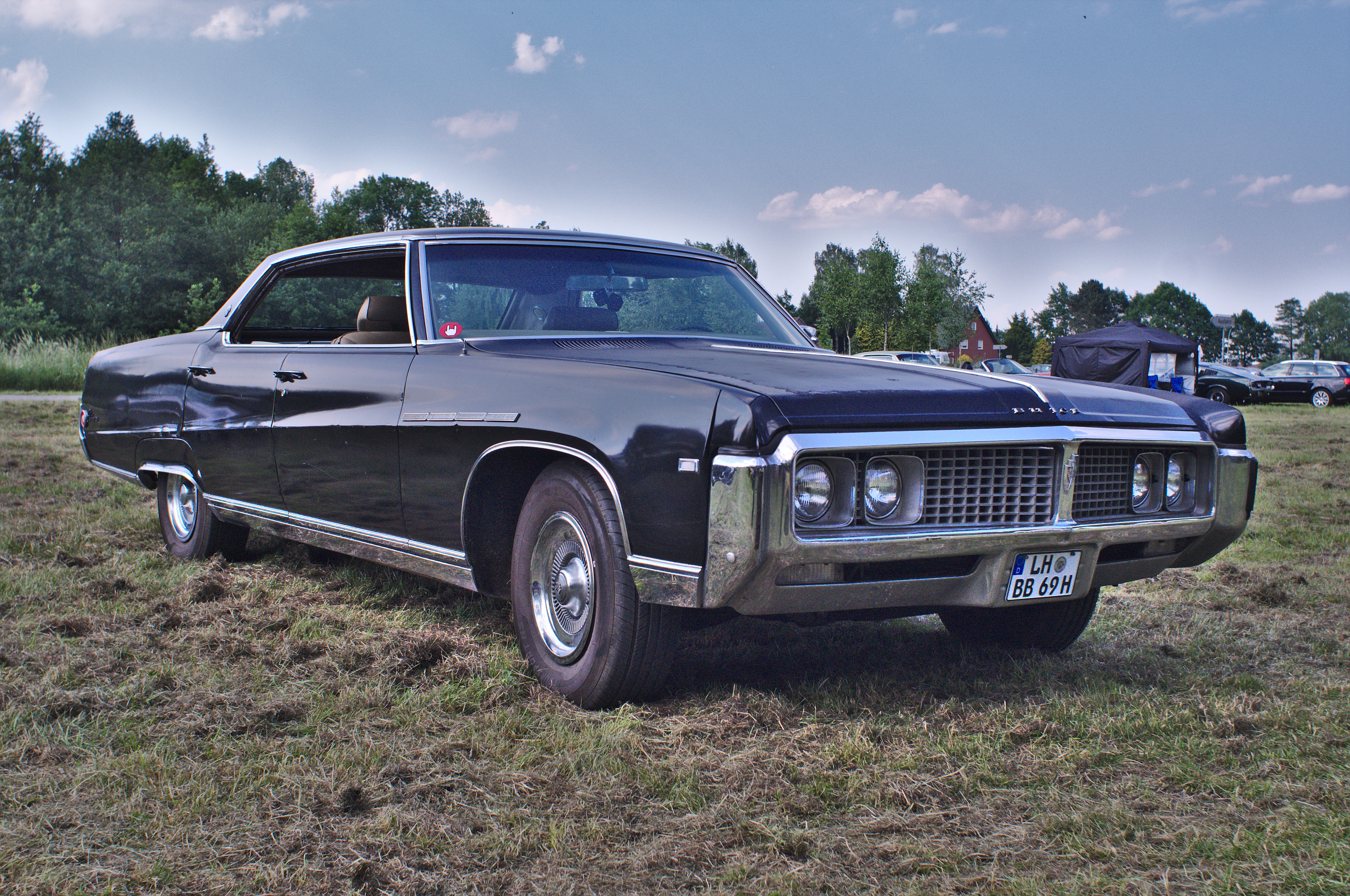
1969 Buick Electra 225 4-door hardtop

1969 brought a major restyling to the Electra 225 and other GM B-body and C-body cars, with somewhat crisper bodylines than 1965–68 models. The same chassis and inner body structure that had been introduced with the 1965 model continued to be used, but the wheelbase was increased an inch to 127 in (3,226 mm). The 1969 models were also the first to offer headrests as standard equipment due to a federal safety mandate, and the steering column with ignition switch that also locked the steering wheel with the transmission in "Park", a feature found on all 1969 GM cars a year before it became a federal safety mandate in 1970. Also new was a variable-ratio power steering system combined with revised front suspension tuning called "Accu-Drive". Other changes included ventless front windows. The same assortment of base and Custom models were offered in 1969 with the "Limited" trim package available on Custom sedans and coupes. A new option available with the Limited package was a split 60/40 bench seat with center armrest. Finned aluminum drum brakes were again offered as standard equipment, while the Bendix four-piston disk brake units were also available. 12 in × 1 in (305 mm × 25 mm) vented steel rotors were coupled with the cast iron caliper assemblies. A dual exhaust was available as an option. Five different rear axles were available: a 2.56 Economy, as well as 2.73, 3.08, and 3.23:1 gear ratios. The special PX-Code "AC Delete" 3.91 performance gear option was also available. The standing quarter mile was completed in 15.5 seconds at a terminal velocity of 90 mph (145 km/h) for the dual exhaust engine with the 2.73 gear ratio in a 4,700 lb (2,132 kg) Custom Convertible.

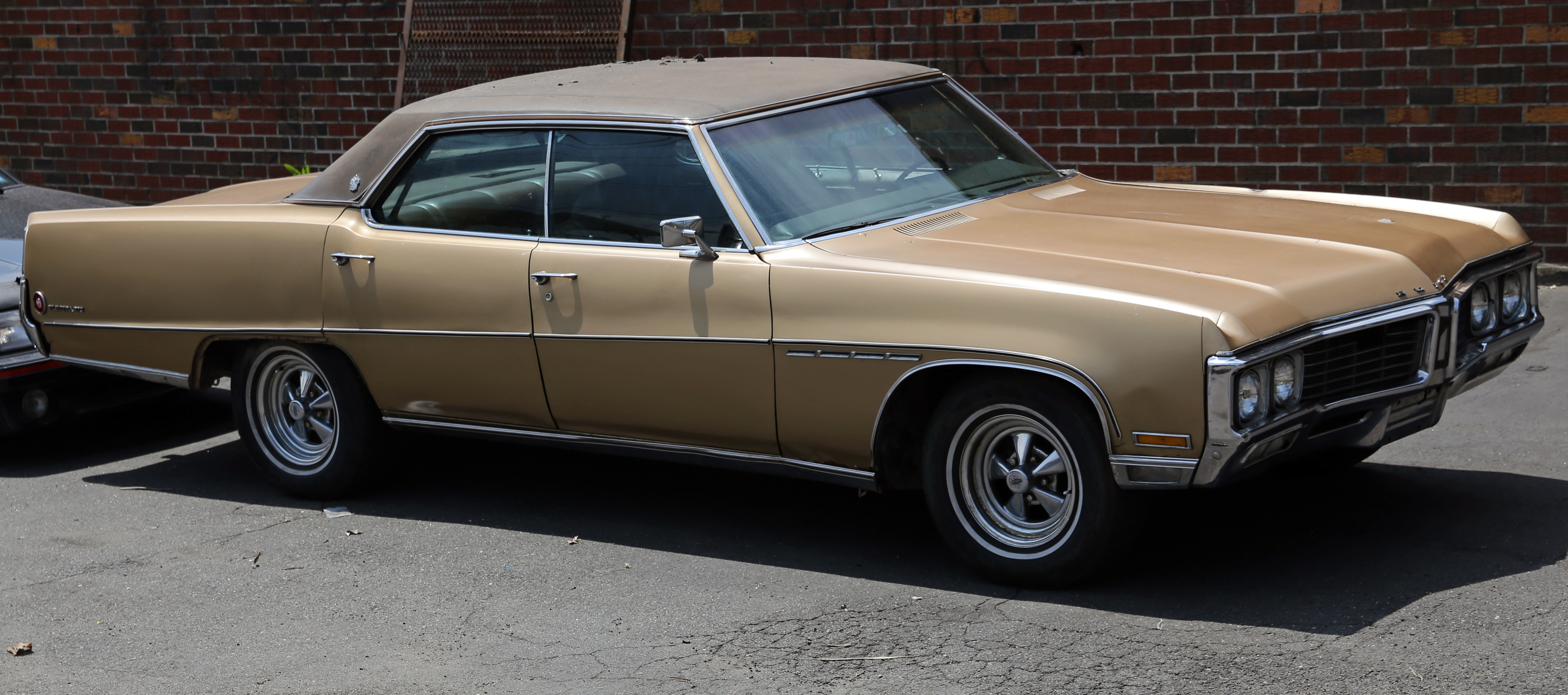
1970 Buick Electra 225 4-door hardtop

Only a minor facelift with revised grille and taillight trim marked the 1970 Electra 225. The large change was in the engine bay, where a new 370 hp (276 kW) 455 cubic-inch V8 replaced the 430 V8 used from 1967 to 1969. This was the final year for the Electra convertible, finned aluminum brake drums and high compression engines. New this year was a concealed radio antenna, which amounted to two wires embedded in the windshield. Also new for 1970 was the Estate Wagon, which shared the Electra's 455 V8 and four VentiPorts, but was a B-body car like the LeSabre and the Wildcat and consequently shared the smaller cars' 124.0-inch (3,150 mm) wheelbase and interior. This was Buick's first full-sized station wagon since 1964. The following year, the Estate would move up to Electra's larger body and more voluminous interior.

== Fourth generation (1971–1976) ==
Fourth generation
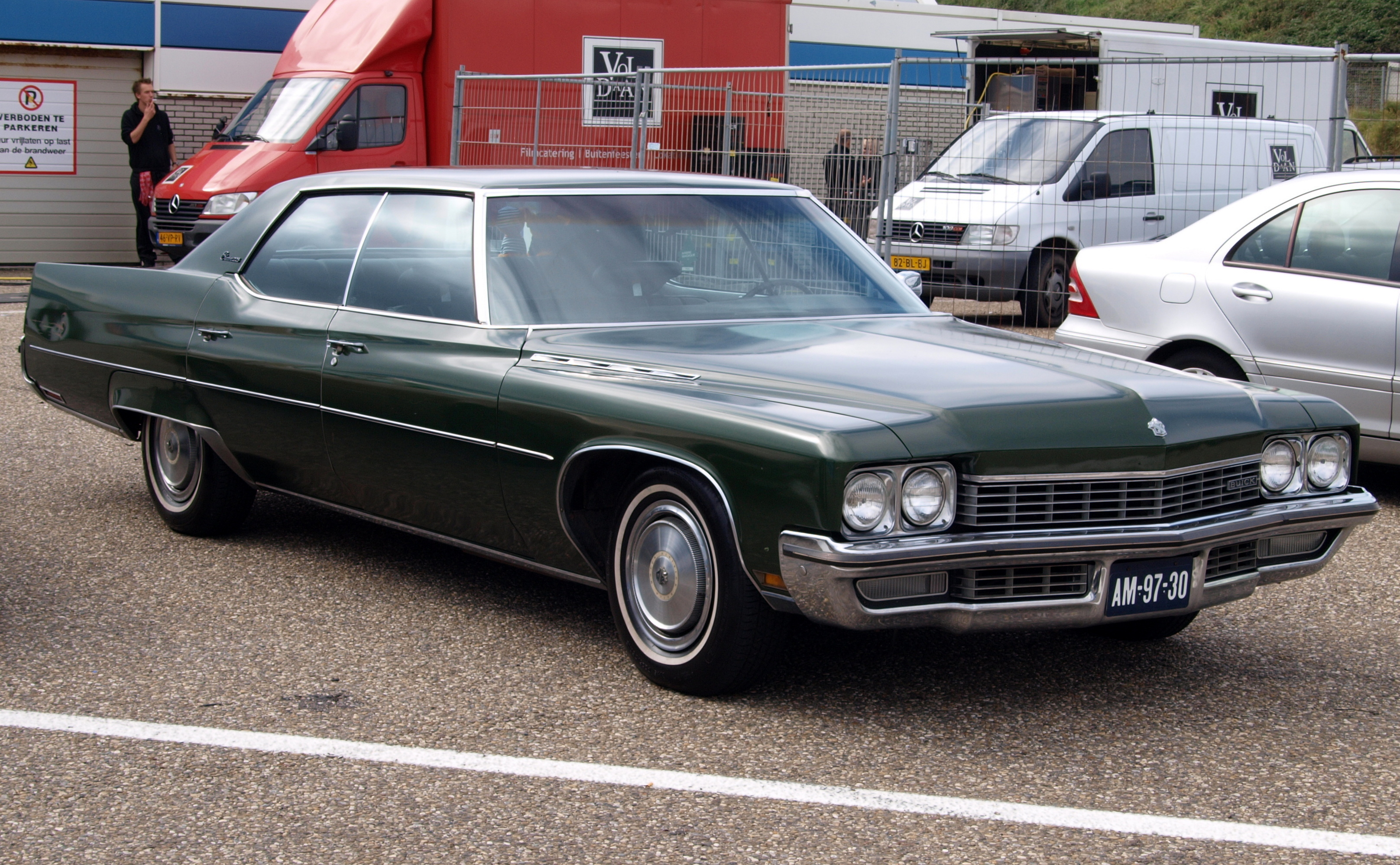
- 1972 Electra 225 4-door hardtop

Overview
- Model years: 1971–1976
- Assembly: United States: Flint, Michigan (Buick City); Kansas City, Kansas (Fairfax Assembly); Linden, New Jersey (Linden Assembly); Wilmington, Delaware (Wilmington Assembly)
- Designer: Bill Mitchell

Body and chassis
- Body style: 4-door hardtop 2-door hardtop 2-door coupe
- Layout: FR layout
- Platform: C-body
- Related: Cadillac De Ville; Cadillac Calais; Buick Estate; Oldsmobile Custom Cruiser; Oldsmobile 98; Pontiac Grand Safari; Pontiac Safari; Chevrolet Kingswood; Chevrolet Townsman

Powertrain
- Engine: 350 cu in (5.7 L) Buick V8; 455 cu in (7.5 L) Buick V8
- Transmission: 3-speed TH-400, automatic

Dimensions
- Wheelbase: 127.0 in (3,226 mm)
- Length: 1971: 226.2 in (5,745 mm); 1972: 227.9 in (5,789 mm); 1973: 229.5 in (5,829 mm); 1974: 231.5 in (5,880 mm); 1975: 233.4 in (5,928 mm); 1976: 233.3 in (5,926 mm)
- Width: 1971–1972: 79.7 in (2,024 mm); 1973: 79.3 in (2,014 mm); 1974–1976: 79.9 in (2,029 mm)
- Height: 1971–1973: 54.9 in (1,394 mm); 1974: 55.0 in (1,397 mm); 1975: 55.1 in (1,400 mm); 1976: 54.5 in (1,384 mm)
- Curb weight: 4,600–5,000 lb (2,087–2,268 kg)

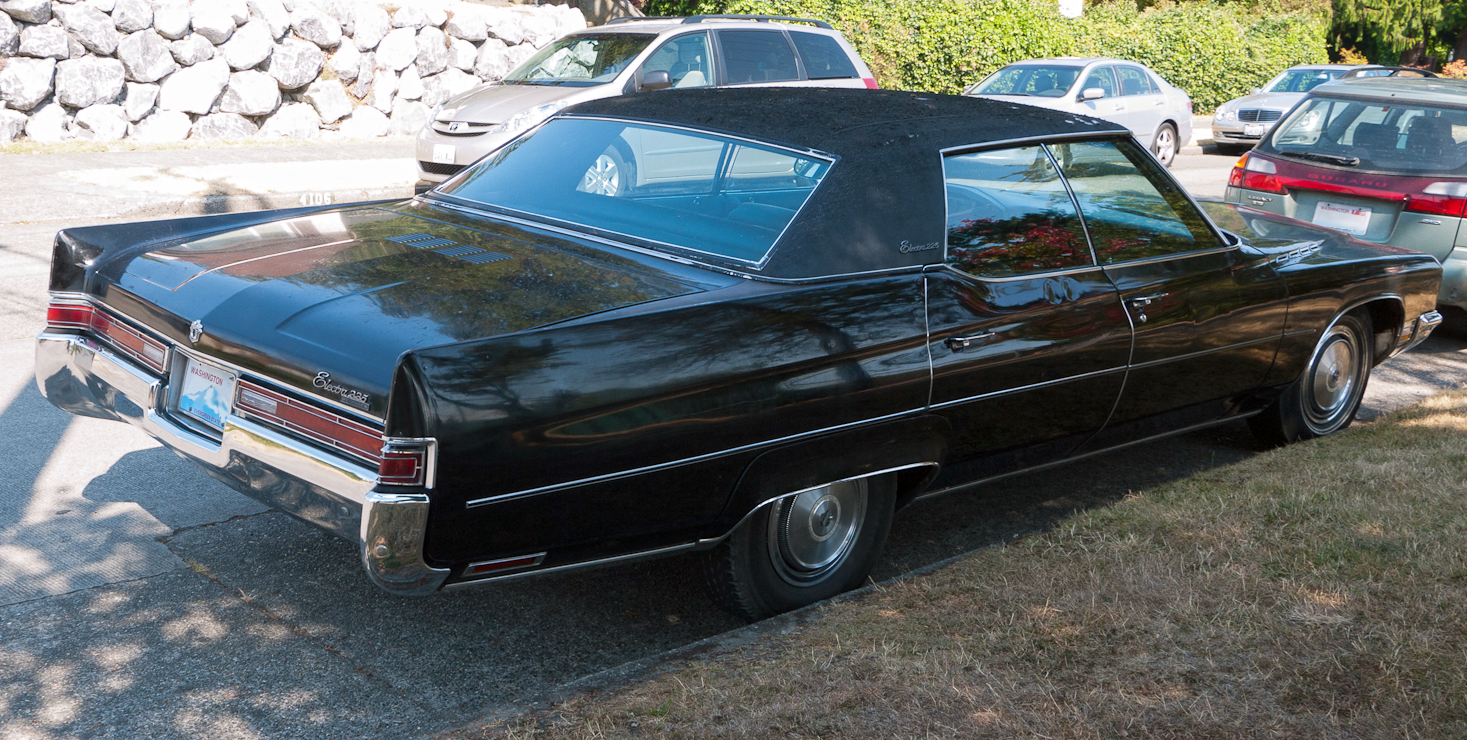
1971 Buick Electra 225 4-door hardtop (rear)

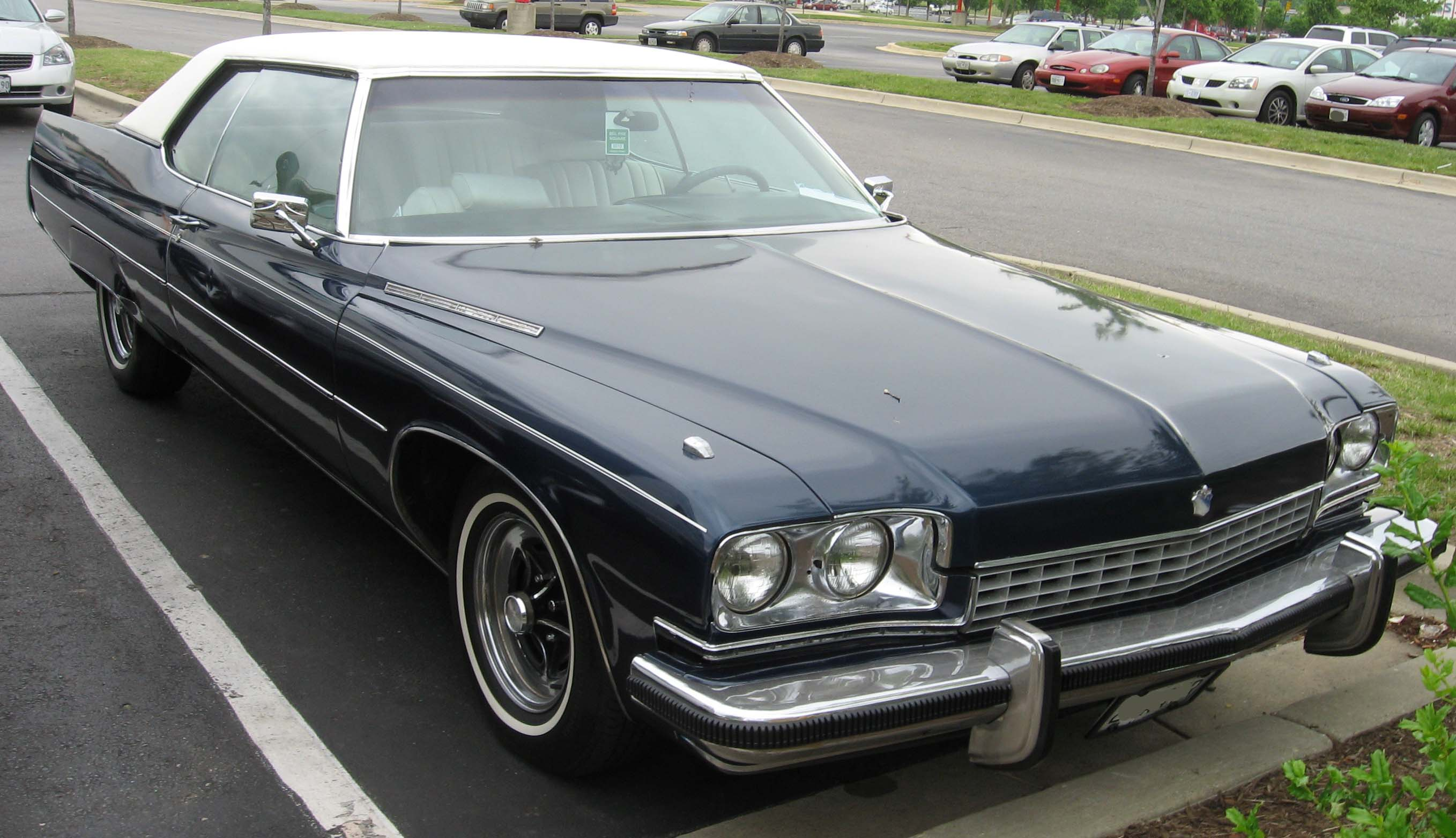
1973 Electra 225 2-door hardtop

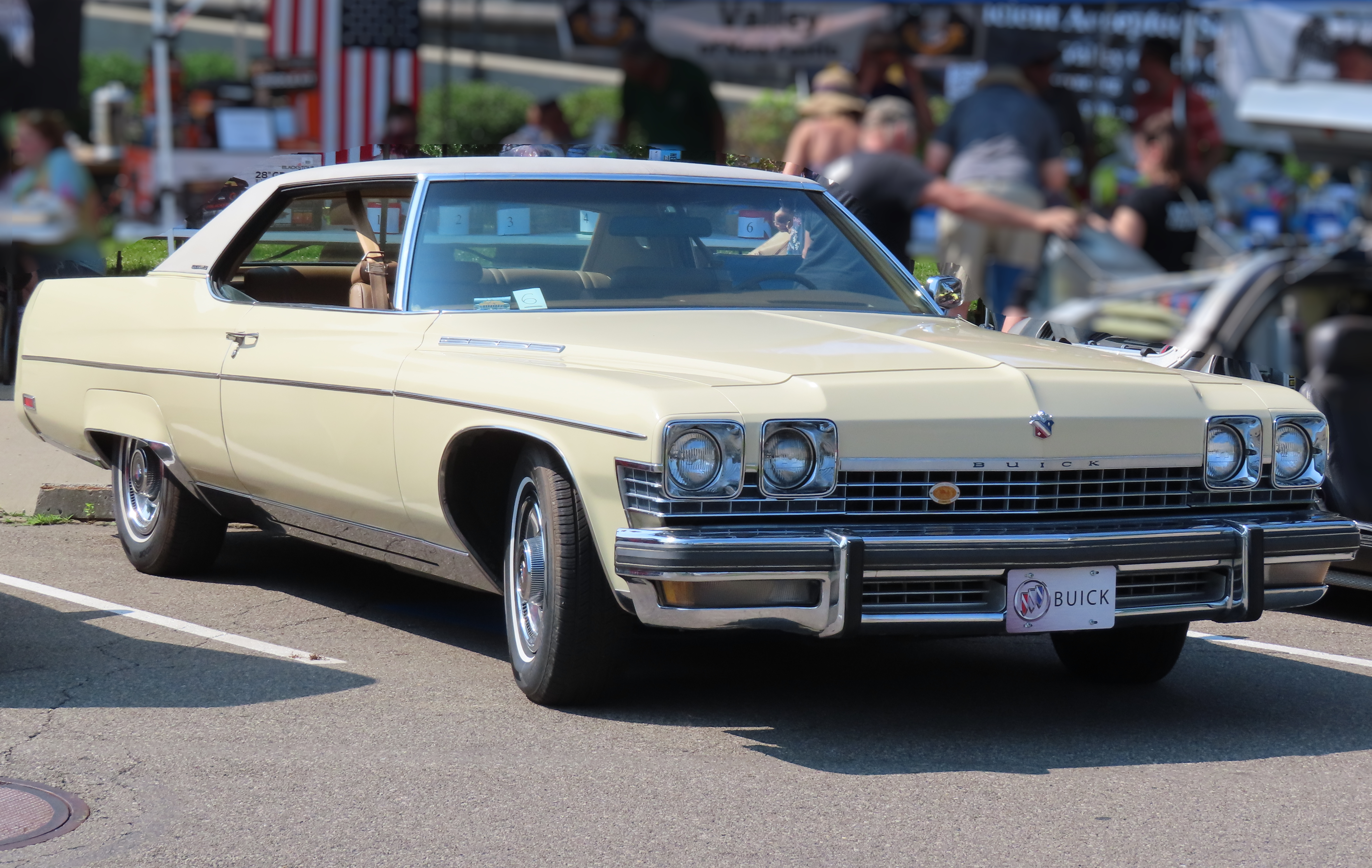
1974 Buick Electra 225 hardtop coupe

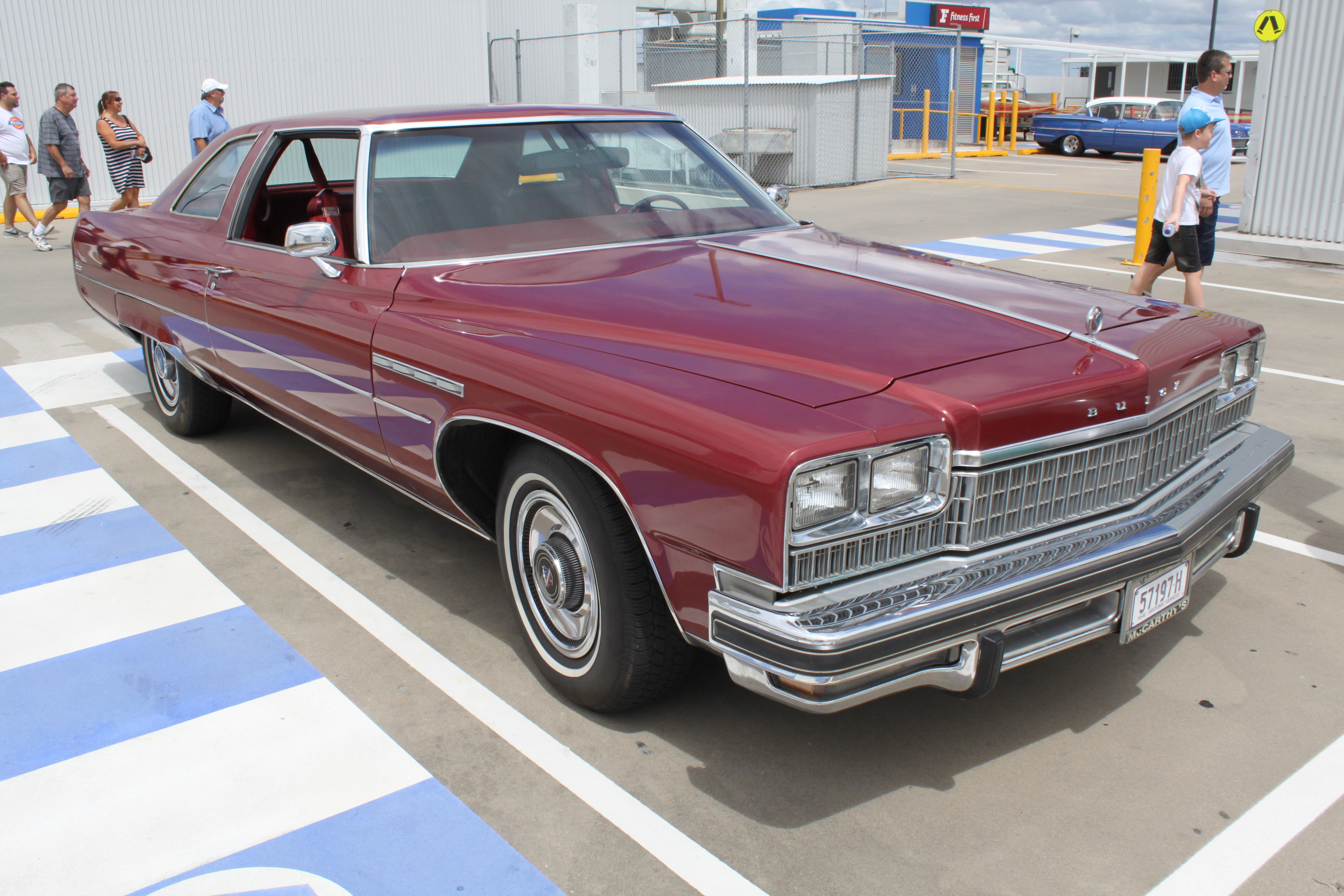
1975 Buick Electra 225 2-door coupe

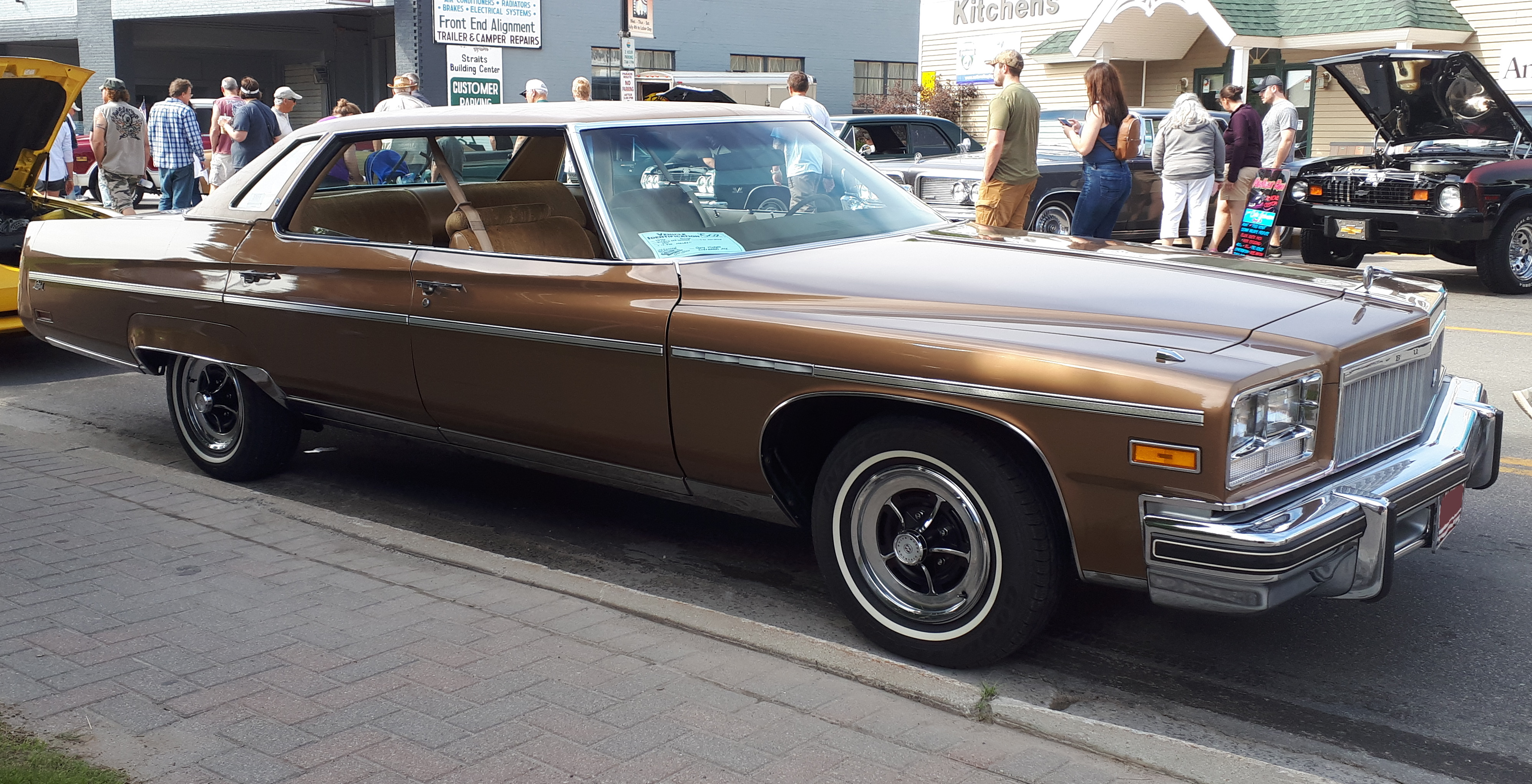
1976 Electra 225 Limited 4-door hardtop

Like the other GM brands, Buick completely restyled its B-body and C-body cars for 1971. The full-size cars emerged larger and heavier than ever before or after. The new GM full-size bodies, at 64.3-inch front shoulder room and 63.4-inch rear shoulder room, set a record for interior width that would not be matched by any car until the full-size GM rear-wheel drive models of the early-to-mid-1990s. The styling featured curved bodysides, long hoods, and wide expanses of glass. All Electra 225s were hardtops in the 1971 to 1973 model years, eliminating the previous four-door pillared sedan variant and the convertible. In 1974, Buick adopted GM's pillared coupe body and fitted it with the "Landau" option on the Electra Limited coupe. Optional driver and passenger airbags were also available from 1974 to 1976, but they were unpopular due to their cost.

In the first year for the new GM C-body shared with Oldsmobile 98 and Cadillac, the 1971 Electra 225 rode on a new body chassis which retained the 127 in (3,226 mm) wheelbase with styling evolutionary from previous models. The new design included a double-shell roof for improved roll-over protection and noise reduction. Inside was a new wrap-around cockpit style instrument panel shared with B-body LeSabre and Centurion models that grouped all instruments with easy reach of the driver. Under the hood, the 455-cubic-inch V8 was retained as standard equipment, but featured a lower compression of 8.5 to 1 (compared to 10.25 to 1 in 1970) as part of a GM corporate mandate requiring all engines to run on 91 Research octane regular leaded, low-lead or unleaded gasolines. Horsepower also dropped from 370 to 315 as a result. Standard equipment continued to consist of variable-ratio power steering and Turbo Hydra-matic transmission. Power front disc brakes were now standard equipment on Electras, replacing the 12 in (305 mm) finned aluminum drum brakes used in full-sized Buicks since the late 1950s. Also new for the 1971 Electra 225, as well as the B-body LeSabre and Centurion, and E-body Riviera, was a new power ventilation system. The system, shared with other GM B-, C- and E-body cars along with the compact Chevrolet Vega, used the heater fan to draw air into the car from the cowl intake, and force it out through vents in the trunk lid or tailgate. In theory, passengers could enjoy fresh air even when the car was moving slowly or stopped, as in heavy traffic; in practice, however, it didn't work. Within weeks of the 1971 models' debut, Buick, and all other GM dealers, received multiple complaints from drivers who complained the ventilation system pulled cold air into the car before the heater could warm up and could not be shut off. The ventilation system was extensively revised for 1972.

From 1971 to 1976, Buick's full-sized Estate Wagon shared the 127.0-inch (3,230 mm) wheelbase and 455 cubic-inch V8 with the Electra 225, and shared its interior and exterior styling from 1971 to 1974 (complete with the prerequisite four VentiPorts). While the number of VentiPorts were reduced by one from 1975 to 1976, and the front fascia was downgraded to a LeSabre's, the Electra 225 style chrome rocker panel moldings and distinctive Electra 225 style rear quarter panels (albeit without fender skirts) remained. These were the first Buick station wagons to be built on Buick's largest chassis since the Roadmaster Estates of 1947–53. As with other GM full-sized wagons of the time, the Estate Wagons used a unique rear suspension with multi-leaf springs instead of the coil springs used on other full-sized Buicks and GM cars. The Estate Wagons also featured a new 'clamshell' tailgate design where the rear power-operated glass slid up into the roof as the tailgate (manually or with power assist) slid into a recess under the cargo floor. The power tailgate, the first in station wagon history, ultimately supplanted the manual tailgate, which required marked effort to lift from storage. It was operated by switches on the instrument panel or a key switch on the rear quarter panel. The heavy and complex clamshell system made it easier to load and unload the extremely long wagons in tight spaces, but remained un-adopted by any other manufacturer. It would be eliminated when GM reduced the length of their wagons by about a foot in 1977, and the overriding concern became increased fuel economy. At 5,182 lb (2,351 kg) shipping weight, or about 5,400 lb (2,400 kg) curb weight, the three-seat 1974 Estate Wagons are the heaviest Buicks ever built, even heavier than the Buick Limited limousines of 1936–42.

A new egg-crate grille and taillight trim highlighted the 1972 Electra 225s. The trouble-prone ventilation system used in 1971 was replaced by a new system using vents in the doorjambs instead of the trunk-mounted vents of 1971. The 455 V8 was carried over, now rated at 250 net horsepower, compared to 315 gross horsepower in 1971. The differences in advertised horsepower in the two years was due to an industry-wide switch from "gross" (dynometer-rated and not installed in vehicle) to "net" (as installed in vehicle with accessories and emission controls installed) horsepower measurements. The 1972 Electra was available as the Electra 225, Electra 225 Custom, and Electra 225 Custom Limited.

A revised egg-crate grille above a new federally mandated 5 mph (8.0 km/h) front bumper and revised taillights were among the most noticeable changes for the 1973 Electra 225. All engines now featured EGR valves to meet increasingly stringent 1973 emission standards (the EGR valve was featured on Buick engines for California cars in 1972).

New grille work and a new rear with revised taillights and a federally mandated 5 mph (8.0 km/h) rear bumper highlighted the 1974 Electra 225, still available in base and up level Electra Custom models. The Electra Limited, previously a luxurious trim option on the Custom models, was upgraded to full model status. Electra Limited models also received power windows, power driver's seat, and a new digital clock as standard equipment, along with an optional leather upholstery trim, the first Buicks (along with that year's Riviera) to offer real leather seats since the 1963 Riviera. The 1974 Buick Electra Limited had velour seats and door panels that were the same as the 1974 Oldsmobile 98 Regency. The 455 V8 was revised to meet the 1974 federal and California emission standards with horsepower dropping from 250 in 1972–73 to 230 for 1974. A one-year-only option for the 1974 Electra was the high-performance Stage 1 455 engine with dual exhausts and a 245 hp (183 kW) rating. 1974 was the last year for the pillarless hardtop coupe, although the 4-door hardtop would continue to be produced until 1976. Inside, the wrap-around instrument panel was substantially revised and optionally available for the first time (and seldom ordered) was a driver's-side airbag system with an exclusive steering wheel design. 1974 was the final year for the Max Trac traction control option. New options for 1974 included radial tires and a "low fuel" warning light came on when the gas tank was down to only four gallons. A new distinctive "Landau" option was available on the Limited coupe that included the now-popular rear side opera windows and rear-quarter vinyl roof.

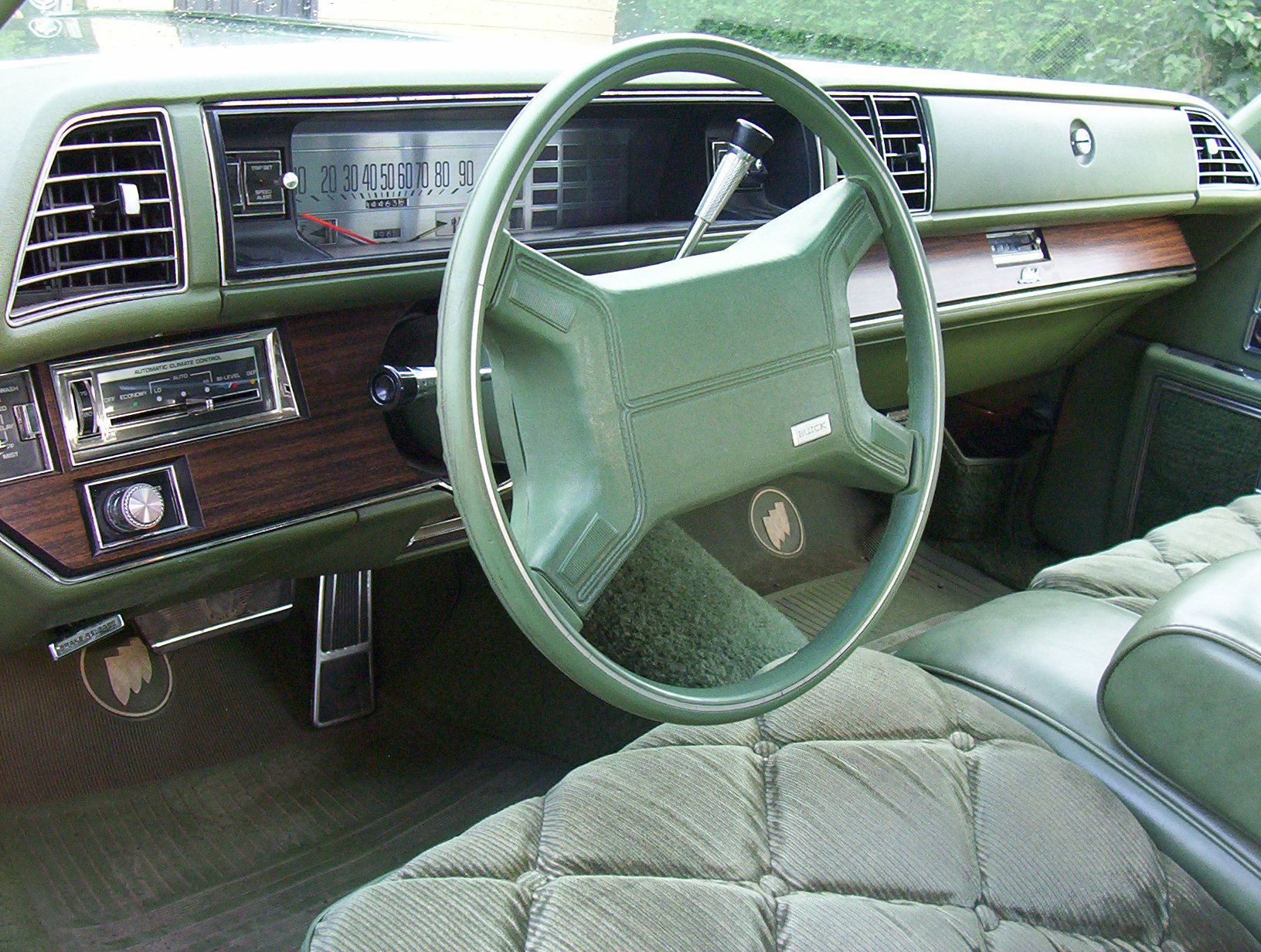
1975 Buick Electra interior

1975 brought about changes in all of GM's C-body cars. In 1975, all Electra 225 coupes had fixed rear side windows and center posts. 1975 also brought along a newer front end and interior design. Rectangular headlights became standard on all GM C-body cars, along with many others. This supposedly would allow engineers to lower the front end to reduce wind resistance, but this wasn't very apparent with the new design. The Electra received a new metal "eggcrate"-style grille, which covered most of the front end, wrapped under the headlights, and included running lights on either side. There was a choice of a base model Electra 225 (whose trim and appointments were upgraded to the same level as the previous year's Electra 225 Custom), an upscale Limited, and the Park Avenue. The 1975 Electra was also the longest Buick ever built, at 233.4 inches (5,928 mm), which is over 19 feet. These cars dwarfed the newer front-wheel drive Electras and Park Avenues in sheer size and weight. Power windows and a power driver's seat became standard on all Electra models in 1975. Also new to the standard equipment list were radial-ply tires. The 1975 Electra was one of the first GM vehicles to offer an Air Cushion Restraint System or "airbag". Inside, a new flat instrument panel (shared with the LeSabre, Estate Wagon and Riviera) with horizontal sweep speedometer (silver facing with black lettering) replaced the wrap-around cockpit dash of previous years, and the door panel trim was revised. The speedometer was scaled back from 120 mph (193 km/h) to 100 mph (161 km/h) and kilometer readings were added. The 1975 Buick Electra Limited got an all new interior. Technical changes for 1975 included the addition of a catalytic converter and electronic ignition to not only meet the stringent 1975 and later emission requirements, but also extended routine maintenance intervals, and improved fuel economy and drivability, which was a must in the years following the 1973–74 energy crisis, but also spelled the end of dual exhaust systems and mandated the use of unleaded gasoline, as the converter could be rendered useless if contaminated with lead. Axle ratios were also numerically lowered to aid in improving gas mileage. The 455 four-barrel V8, now rated at 205 hp (153 kW), was retained as the standard and only available engine.

1976 brought about a few changes on the Electra. The front end was reworked, including the grille and bumper. The new plastic grille featured 17 vertical bars and covered much of the radiator. The grille did not extend under the headlights in 1976, but instead Buick moved the running lights and turn signal lights underneath the headlights, where the 1975 grille had once been. The bumper no longer housed running lights. There were also some minor interior differences. The brake release handle was black instead of chrome, and the seat material was slightly different on the Limited, with notch-back diamond pattern seating. The 1975 material appeared in a "corduroy" form, but the actual material was not corduroy. The 1976 diamond pattern seating material did not have this appearance. The engine air cleaner did not have a "cold-air" ram air intake hose like the 1975 model did, and there were some carburetor changes and camshaft changes to meet EPA standards. The rear end ratio also was higher than the 1975 standard, at 2.56:1 instead of 2.73:1. The Park Avenue and leather seating in 1975 and 1976 were the same. Once again, there was the base 225, the Limited, and the luxurious Park Avenue. The Park Avenue Deluxe vanished for 1976 due to poor sales. The 1976 Electra is about the same size as the 1975 at 233.3 inches (5,926 mm), making them among the biggest Buicks ever.

The 1975 Buick Electra 225 Limited was the longest four-door hardtop car GM had ever built, as the Cadillac Sixty Special (which was a bit longer) was unavailable as a hardtop sedan since the mid-1960s. The model also ushered in a return of the six window configuration that Buick offered between 1959 and 1964.

All Electras were powered by Buick's 455 cu. in. (7.5 L) engine between 1971 and 1976. The 1971 model had 315 hp (235 kW), but it was reduced to 205 hp (153 kW) by the 1976 model year. Increasingly stringent exhaust emission limits reduced engine output, and an industry-wide 1972 change in rating systems reduced the horsepower numbers produced by any given engine. Even at its weakest state, the Buick-built 455 engine still produced 345 lb⋅ft (468 N⋅m) of torque at 2000 rpm. The 455 was the standard engine on the Electra, but there were some built with Buick 350s during the GM strike, when 455 production halted. The 350 engine also came with a price rebate. The 455 engine disappeared after the 1976 model year in favor of smaller, more efficient engines.

To commemorate the 1976 United States Bicentennial, the standard colors available on all Buicks were Judicial Black, Liberty White, Pewter Gray, Potomac Blue, Continental Blue, Concord Green, Constitution Green, Mount Vernon Cream, Buckskin Tan, Musket Brown, Boston Red and Independence Red, with specially available colors Congressional Cream, Revere Red, Colonial Yellow and Firecracker Orange on select models.

Total production for this generation was 794,833.

=== Electra Limited Park Avenue ===
Introduced for the 1975 model year as an option package for the Electra Limited sedan, the Park Avenue was originally an interior comfort and appearance package which gave buyers velour, pillow-topped seating, velour headliner, thicker carpet, and an upscale door panel design. The Park Avenue's seats were designed by Flexsteel. This seating design was similar to the Cadillac Fleetwood Sixty Special with the Talisman (1974–1976) option, and stayed with Park Avenue through the 1980 model year. The Park Avenue option also offered a full-size center console which eliminated the front, middle passenger space. The center console was eliminated in 1977. 1975 also offered a more luxurious Park Avenue Deluxe, which was sold only in 1975, and included every option available on the Electra (Positive Traction, 15-inch rallye sport wheels, rear automatic leveling, etc.). The Park Avenue Deluxe was an expensive option that was not popular with buyers; only 37 were built. The Park Avenue would remain as the top-level trim package through 1988. In 1989, the Electra Park Avenue Ultra debuted as the top model. In 1991, the Electra name would be dropped completely and Park Avenue would replace it as the flagship Buick sedan.

== Fifth generation (1977–1984) ==
Fifth generation
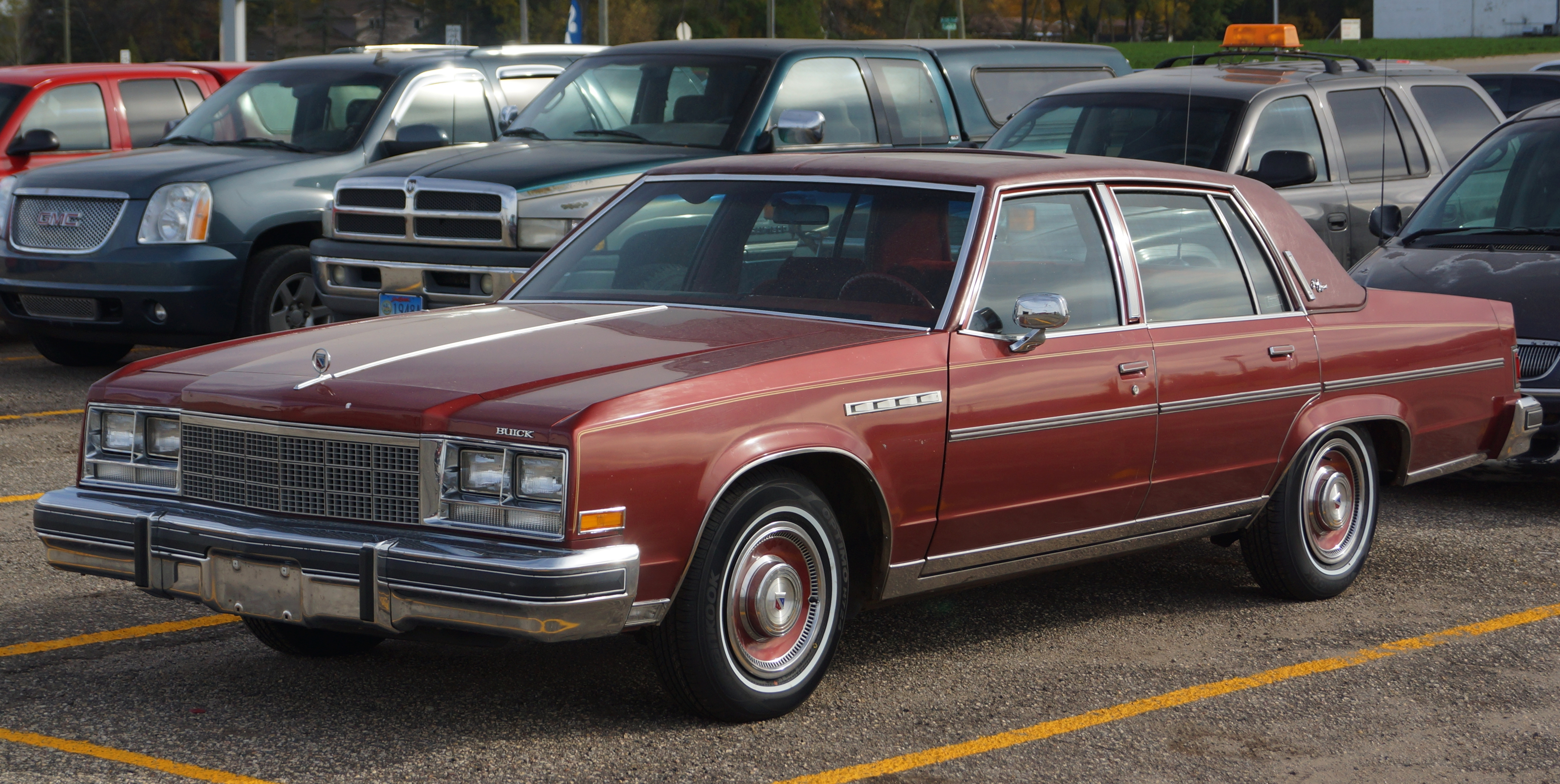
- 1979 Electra Park Avenue sedan

Overview
- Model years: 1977–1984
- Assembly: United States: Flint, Michigan (Buick City); Linden, New Jersey (Linden Assembly) (1977-1978); Kansas City, Kansas (Fairfax Assembly) (station wagon only)

Body and chassis
- Body style: 4-door sedan 2-door coupe 4-door station wagon
- Layout: FR layout
- Platform: C-body
- Related: Cadillac Fleetwood Brougham; Cadillac De Ville; Oldsmobile 98

Powertrain
- Engine: Gasoline: 252 cu in (4.1 L) Buick V6; 307 cu in (5.0 L) Oldsmobile V8; 350 cu in (5.7 L) Buick V8; 403 cu in (6.6 L) Oldsmobile V8; Diesel: 350 cu in (5.7 L) Oldsmobile V8
- Transmission: 3-speed TH350 automatic 4-speed THM200-4R automatic

Dimensions
- Wheelbase: 118.9 in (3,020 mm)
- Length: 1977–79: 222.1 in (5,641 mm); 1980: 220.9 in (5,611 mm); 1981–82: 221.2 in (5,618 mm); 1983–84: 221.3 in (5,621 mm)
- Width: 1977–79: 77.2 in (1,961 mm); 1980: 78.0 in (1,981 mm); 1981: 75.9 in (1,928 mm); 1982–84: 76.2 in (1,935 mm)
- Height: 1977–79: 55.7 in (1,415 mm); 1980: 55.6 in (1,412 mm); 1981: 55.0 in (1,397 mm); 1982–84: 56.9 in (1,445 mm)
- Curb weight: 3,800–4,200 lb (1,700–1,900 kg)

For 1977, a fifth-generation Electra was introduced as GM downsized its C-body full-size lines. Again a counterpart of the Oldsmobile 98, the Electra shed over 11 inches of length and over 800 pounds of curb weight. Coinciding with the major size reduction, Buick ended production of hardtop body styles, with both two- and four-door Electras offered only as pillared sedans. The downsized model brought increased sales, with 161,627 Electras produced in 1977.

As a consequence of the lighter body and chassis, the 455 V8 of the previous generation was retired entirely, with a 4-barrel Buick 350 V8 returning as the standard engine. The Oldsmobile 403 V8 was introduced as an optional engine.

The Electra was offered in standard, 225, and Limited trims; the Park Avenue option was added, though the full-length center console option was deleted from the option package. The Estate Wagon shifted to the B-body chassis of the LeSabre, adopting the front fascia of the Electra (with premium versions sharing interior trim). For 1978, the Electra Park Avenue was added as a distinct trim level.

From 1977 to 1979, the exterior of the Electra saw minor yearly revisions. For 1978, the grille was updated along with revised taillamps. For 1979, the front fascia was restyled with a flatter look, adding the Buick emblem to the taillamps.

For 1980, all GM B and C-bodies underwent a mid-cycle model update, with multiple aerodynamic enhancements to the body. Distinguished by a slightly lower hoodline, the sloped headlamp housings made their return, with a vertically-slatted grille. In a notable change, the Electra 225 model name (in use since 1959) was retired. To improve fuel economy, the Electra was no longer offered with a standard V8 engine, replaced with a Buick 4.1 L V6. The Buick 350 now became an option, with the Oldsmobile 5.7 L diesel V8 introduced as an additional option.

For 1981, the Oldsmobile 307 V8 replaced the Buick 350. The 4.1 L V6 and 307 V8 engines were paired with the new 4-speed THM200-4R automatic transmission, which used a lockup torque converter and a 0.67:1 overdrive ratio. With this new transmission, the Electra could be equipped with a numerically higher rear axle ratio for better performance, while offering improved fuel economy with the overdrive range. The 3-speed THM350 transmission was still used with the 5.7 L diesel V8. Also for 1981, the VentiPorts were deleted from non-Park Avenue trims. On Electra Park Avenues, the Ventiports became vestigial indentations in the chrome fender trim.

For 1982, all engines were now paired with the 4-speed overdrive transmission.

For 1985, General Motors downsized nearly all of its full-size lines a second time. While the Chevrolet Caprice Classic (which replaced the Chevrolet Impala) and GM full-size station wagons remained, Buick, Oldsmobile, and Pontiac shifted to the front-wheel drive C-body and H-body platforms; Cadillac adopted the C-body for much of its lineup, with the Cadillac Brougham (replacing the de Ville and Fleetwood Brougham) remaining to support livery and professional car sales.

Production of the rear-wheel drive Electra ceased in April 1984. Though it would use the slightly smaller B-body chassis (from the 1977–1985 LeSabre), the 1992–1996 Buick Roadmaster served as a functional successor of the 1977–1984 Buick Electra. As of current North American production, the Roadmaster remains the final rear-wheel drive Buick sedan powered by a V8 engine.

While GM downsized its C-body sedans for 1985, Buick, Oldsmobile, and Pontiac full-size station wagons retained the full-size B-body platform for 1985. Buick continued the use of the Electra Estate name for its highest-trim station wagon, which also served as the flagship station wagon of General Motors (as Cadillac did not offer a station wagon at the time). For 1990, Buick renamed its full-size wagon as the Buick Estate Wagon (dropping Electra and LeSabre). For 1991, the B-body wagons were redesigned, with Buick introducing the Buick Roadmaster Estate.

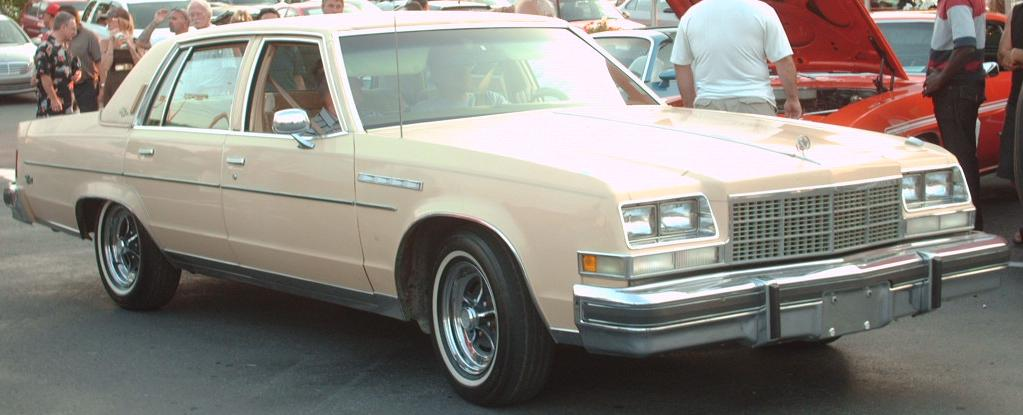
1977 Buick Electra Park Avenue sedan

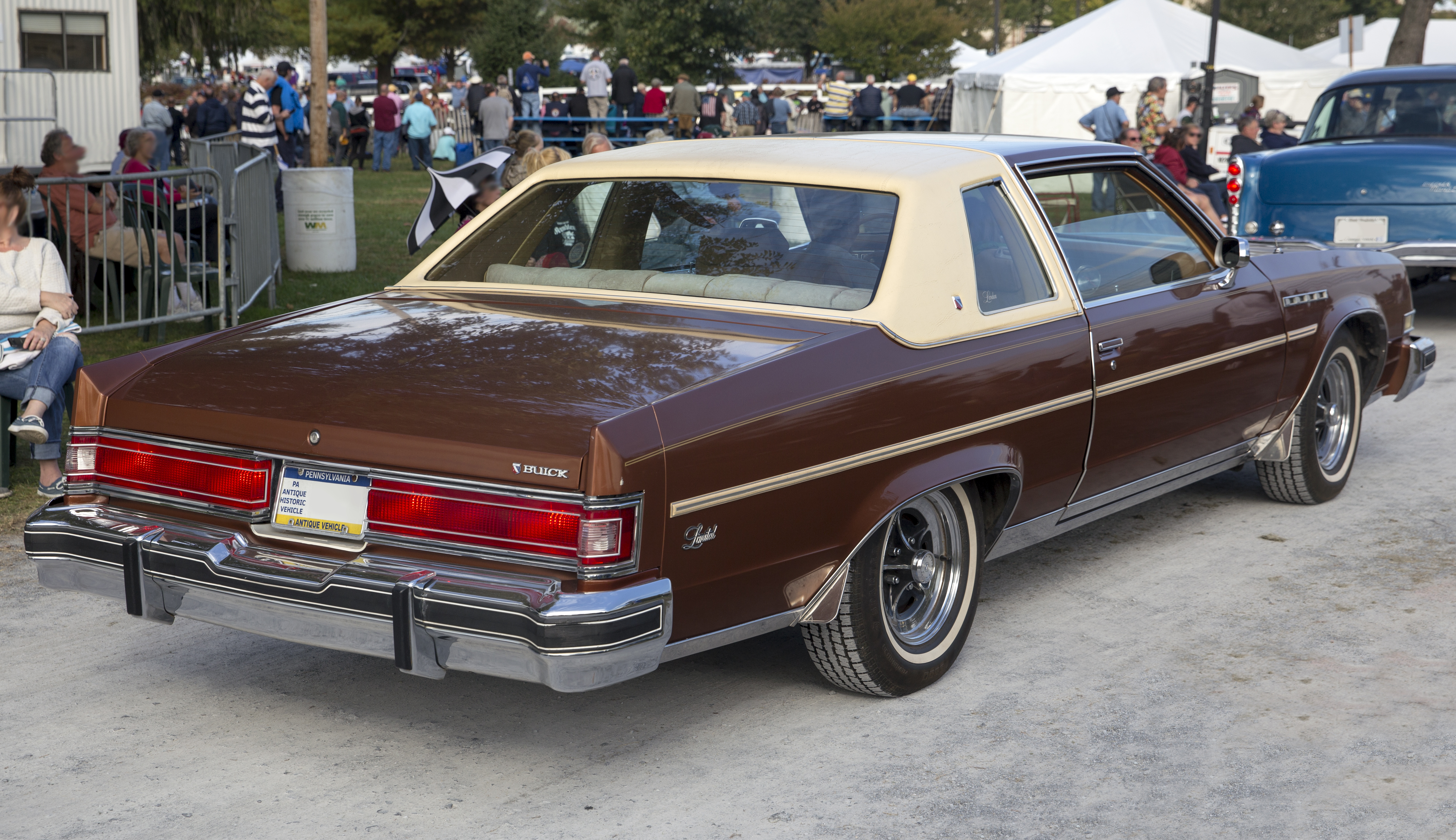
1978 Buick Electra Limited Landau Coupe (rear)

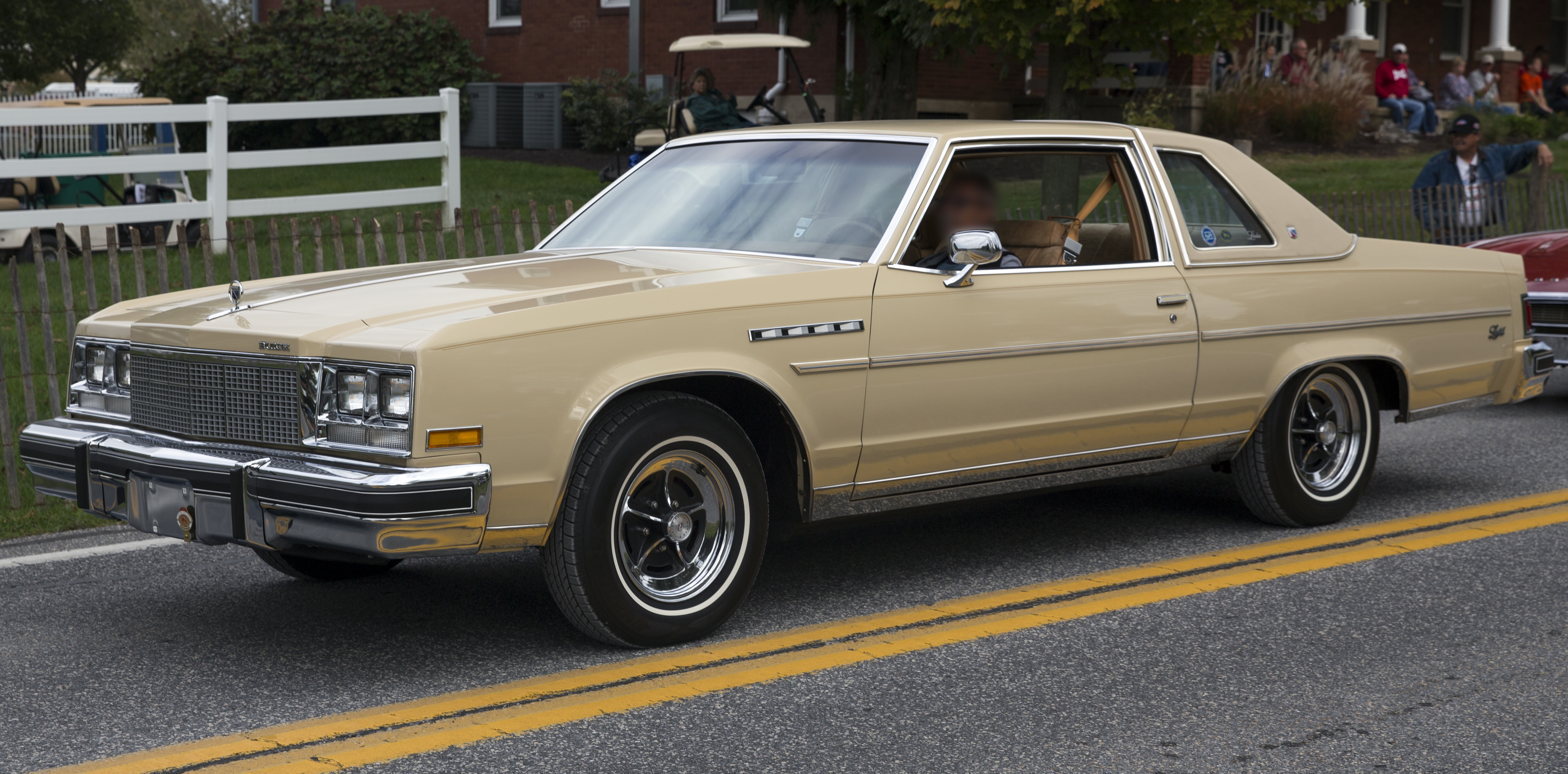
1979 Buick Electra Limited Landau Coupe

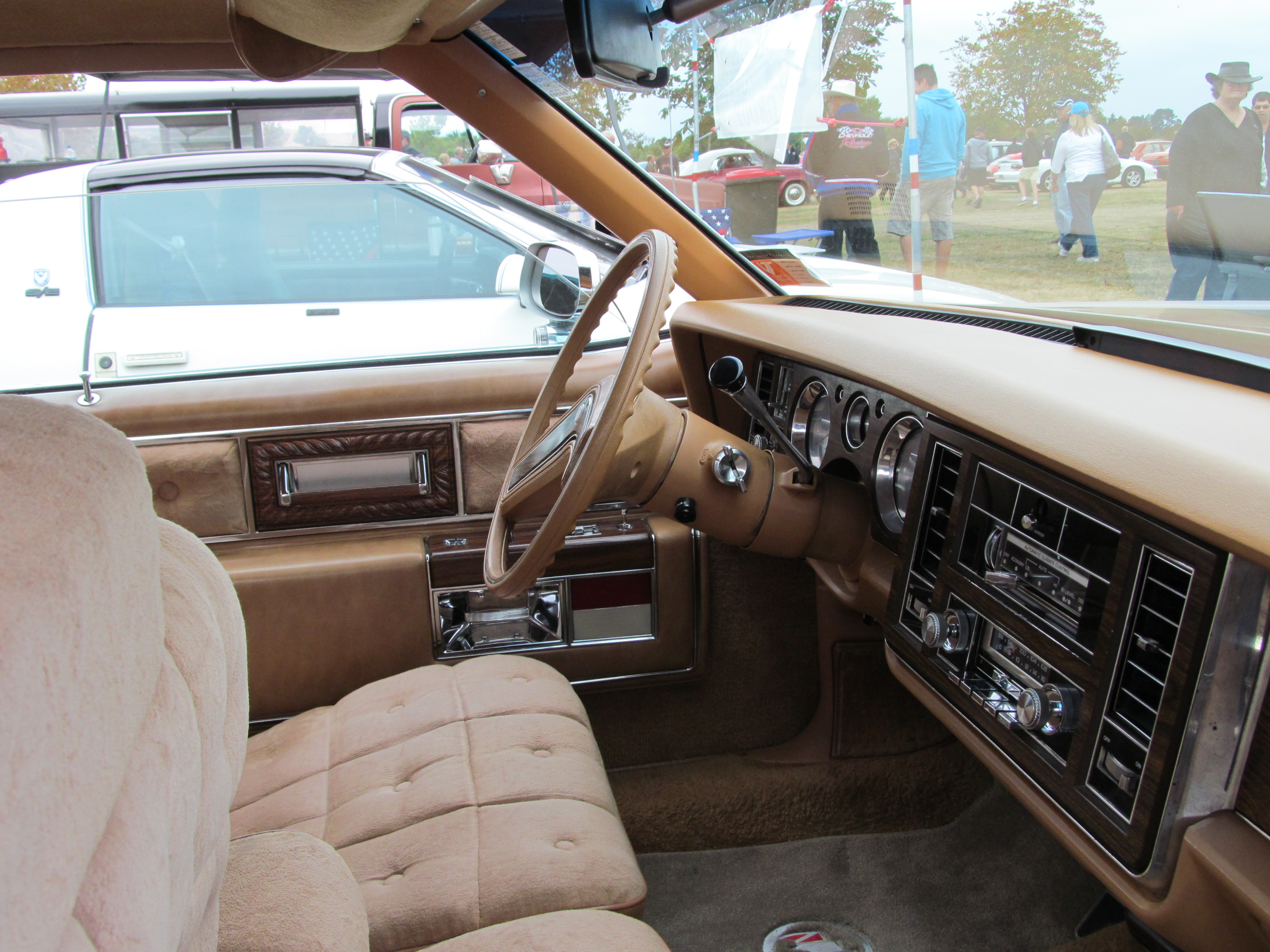
1977-1979 Buick Electra 225 Limited Coupe interior

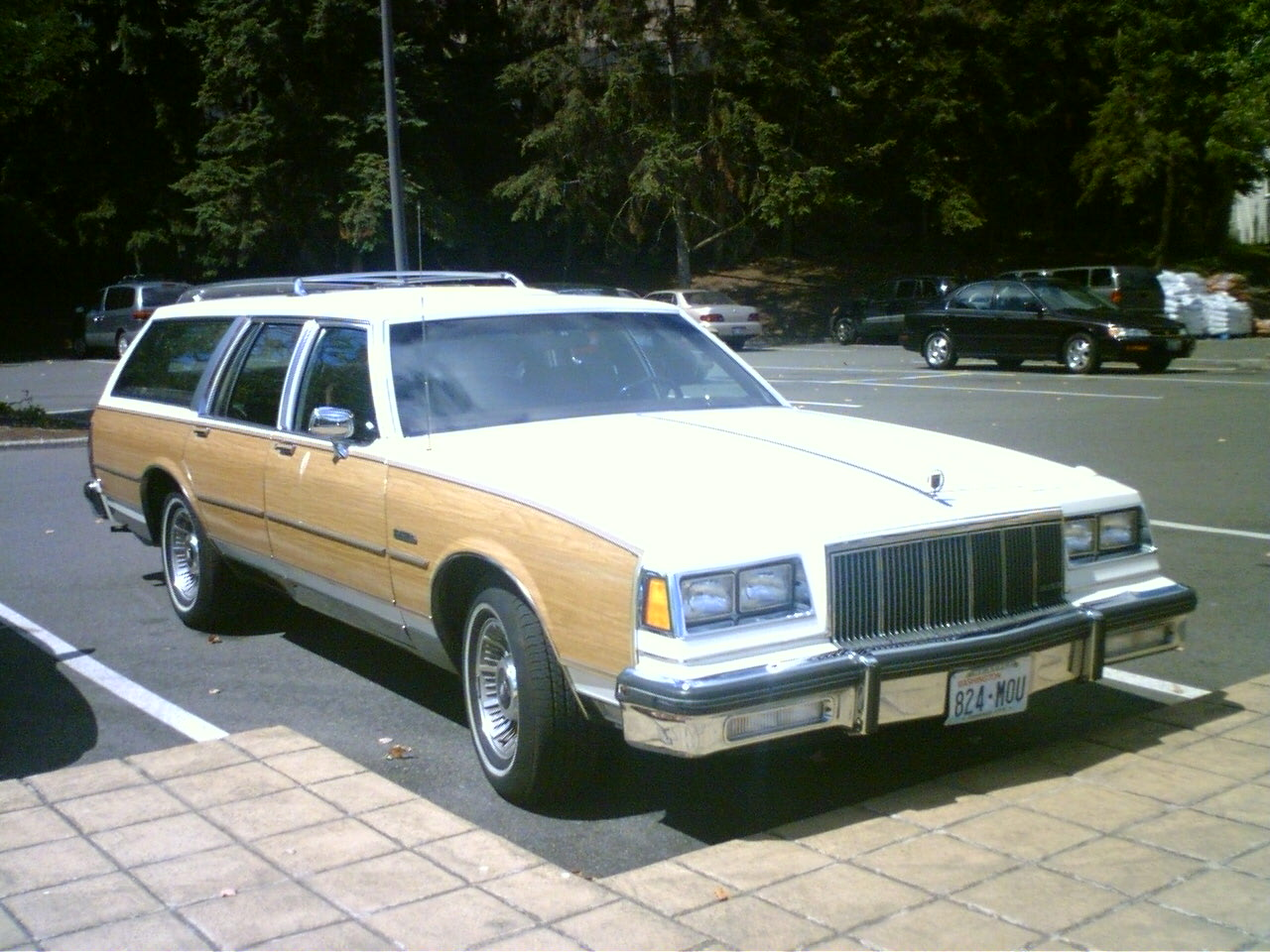
1982 Buick Electra Estate Wagon

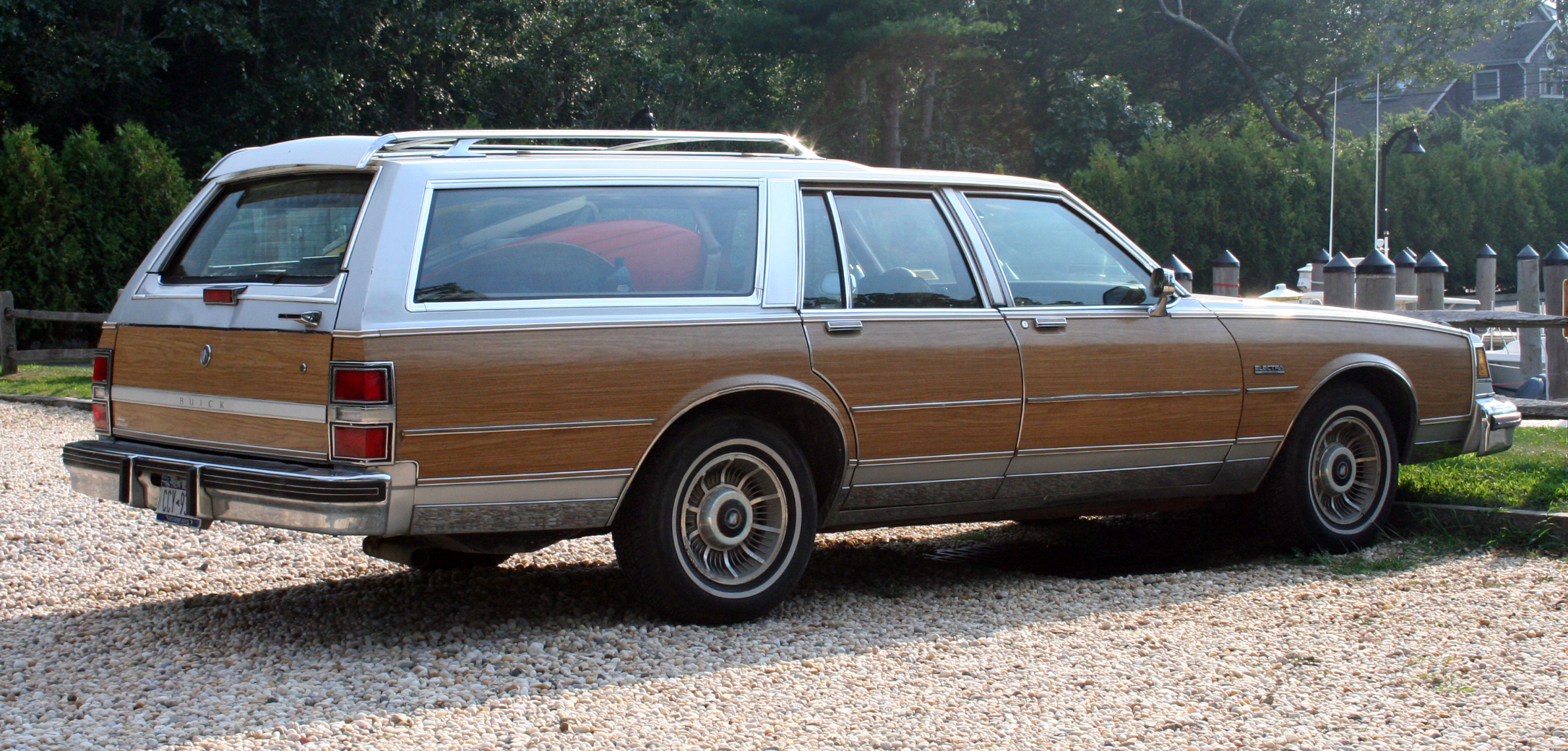
1980s Buick Electra Estate

Buick Electra production figures
	Coupe	Sedan	Wagon	Total
1977	53,633	107,994	–	161,627
1978	41,624	79,925	–	121,549
1979	34,236	87,395	–	121,631
1980	14,058	54,422	N/A	68,480
1981	10,151	58,832	6,334	75,317
1982	8,449	59,601	8,182	76,232
1983	8,885	79,700	9,581	98,166
1984	4,075	52,551	17,563	74,189
Total	175,111	580,420	41,660	797,191

For 1985–1990 figures, see Buick Estate.

== Sixth generation (1985–1990) ==
Sixth generation
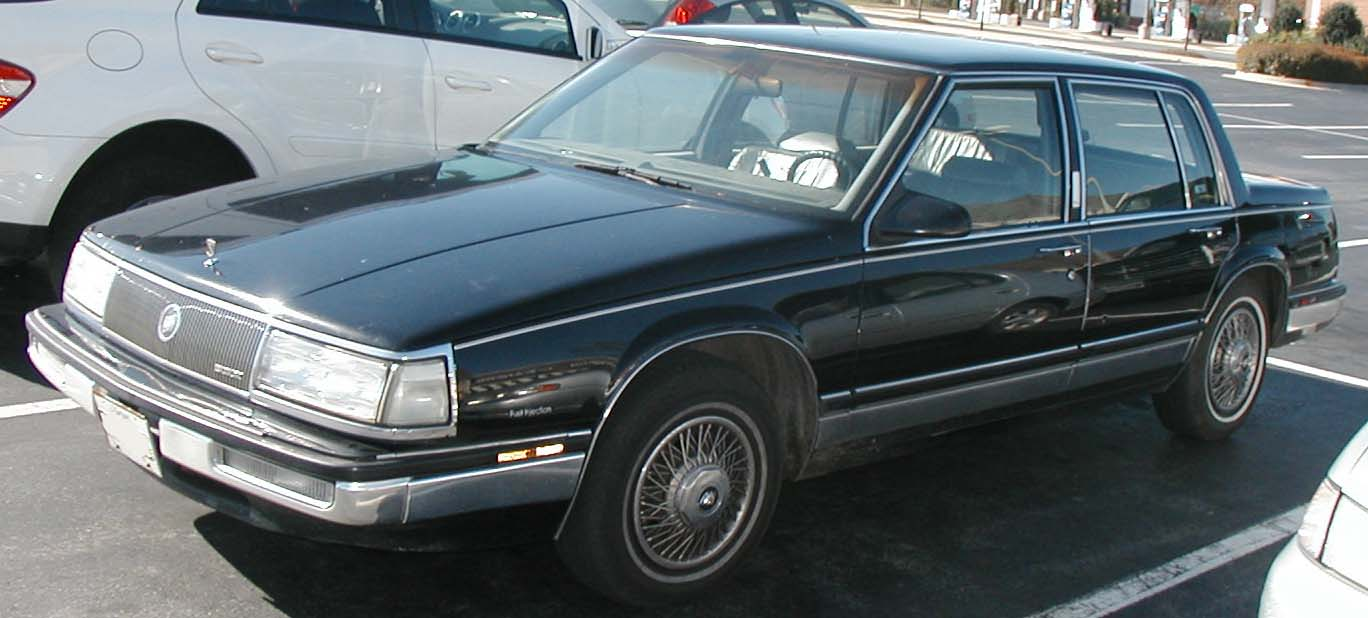
- 1987–1990 Electra Park Avenue

Overview
- Production: 1984–1990
- Model years: 1985–1990
- Assembly: Wentzville, Missouri, Wentzville Assembly
- Designer: Buick Studio One Team, led by Bill Porter under the design direction of Irv Rybicki

Body and chassis
- Body style: 4-door sedan 2-door coupe
- Layout: Transverse FF layout
- Platform: C-body
- Related: Cadillac Sixty Special; Cadillac Fleetwood; Cadillac Deville; Oldsmobile 98; Buick LeSabre; Oldsmobile 88

Powertrain
- Engine: Gasoline: 3.0 L Buick V6; 3.8 L Buick V6; Diesel: 4.3 L Oldsmobile V6
- Transmission: 4-speed THM440-T4 automatic

Dimensions
- Wheelbase: 110.8 in (2,814 mm)
- Length: 1985–86: 197.0 in (5,004 mm); 1987: 197.4 in (5,014 mm); 1988–90: 197.0 in (5,004 mm)
- Width: 1985–86: 72.4 in (1,839 mm); 1987: 72.1 in (1,831 mm); 1988–90: 72.4 in (1,839 mm)
- Height: 1985–86: 54.3 in (1,379 mm); 1987: 54.2 in (1,377 mm); 1988–90: 54.3 in (1,379 mm)
- Curb weight: 3,300–3,600 lb (1,500–1,600 kg)

For its sixth and final generation, GM downsized the 1985 Electra, using the company's newly developed C platform shared with the Oldsmobile 98 and the Cadillac Deville as well as their variants. Beginning with 1985 models, these were GM's first front-drive, transverse-engine, full-size cars — offered in two- and four-door sedan body styles. Launched in April 1984, the sixth-generation Electra was marketed briefly alongside its rear-wheel drive predecessor, which ended production the same month.

The C platform was essentially identical to GM's H platform, shared with the Buick LeSabre, Oldsmobile 88 and Pontiac Bonneville.

Using unibody rather than body-on-frame construction, the sixth generation was significantly shorter (24 inches), narrower, lighter (604 lbs) and more fuel efficient than the previous generation — nearly matching the key interior dimension of their predecessors, losing only one cubic foot of interior volume while providing a more nearly flat passenger compartment floor. Jim Dunne, an automotive journalist for Popular Science magazine, nonetheless noted that the cars did feel smaller inside; they featured thinner front seats and more tumblehome, thereby locating the side glass as well as the windshield closer to passengers.

Introduced in early 1984 for the 1985 model year, it was offered in three trim levels: Electra (300, 380 or 430 correlating to engine displacement); Park Avenue, the luxury variant; and the T-Type, a more sporty variant. In 1989, Buick would introduce the Park Avenue Ultra, a more luxurious trim variant. Engines initially included a 3L Buick V6; 3.8L Buick V6, and 4.3L Oldsmobile diesel V6. By model year 1986, Buick would offer only one engine, the 3.8L V6 — which would continue to evolve as the sole engine for the Electra line.

Standard features included a four-speed automatic transmission with overdrive; multi-port (later sequential) fuel injection with mass airflow sensor; four wheel-independent suspension, marketed as Dynaride; 14-inch steel wheels with covers; power windows; air conditioning; rack and pinion steering; and electronic fuel door release. Park Avenue trim included coach lamps, cruise control, acoustics package, electric door locks and trunk release. T-Type trim included the 3.8-liter engine; upgraded, firm suspension marketed as Grand Touring suspension, ceiling console, quartz analog gage cluster, black-wall radial all season tires, re-calibrated steering, 15-inch alloy wheels, 45/45 bucket front seats with floor console; leather-wrapped steering wheel; and passenger assist straps.

Optional features included two-position memory driver seat, electronic instrument/gage cluster; analog instrument/gage cluster; 14-inch alloy wheels; driver's sill-mounted button-operated keypad entry system, passenger and driver powered seats, and electronic climate control. An electronic rear load-leveling suspension was offered, using air-pressurized rear Chapman struts to maintain a level ride height.

Aside from its waterfall grille, the Electra was differentiated from its Oldsmobile and Cadillac counterparts by an engine hood that slid forward several inches on opening, and pivoted forward from its leading edge to provide engine access from each side. A similar "clamshell" approach had been initially considered for the trunk. On Park Avenue trims, an articulated chrome band that ran the length of the car, integrating the front and rear bumpers, and all trims featured a rear drop-in license plate holder (shared with the LeSabre as well as the contemporary Riviera) and tilt-up taillight assemblies for convenient bulb changing. All C-bodies as well as H-bodies, benefited from GM's first effort to begin addressing the "design" of the engine bay, to provide a more logical, organized layout.

For 1986, the 3.8L Buick V6 became the sole engine choice. The spare tire and wheel were relocated from an upright position at the forward trunk bulkhead, to a flat position under the load floor; the federally-mandated Center High Mount Stop Lamp (CHMSL) was introduced; a revised "shell system" carpeting with an insulation layer and a preformed backing layer was introduced; anti-lock brakes became optional; electronic digital instrumentation became available; cell phone pre-wiring became optional; a retractable clothes hanger became standard equipment on the Park Avenue trim level.

For 1987, flush composite headlamps replaced previous exposed sealed-beam headlamps, with fixed glass and replaceable bulbs accessible from under hood; outside sideview mirrors were redesigned. For 1987, an Electra Limited trim replaced the Electra "number nomenclature" trim.

The two-door body style was eliminated for 1988, after an approximate total production of 15,000. That same model year, Buick introduced the 3800 V6, a major engine redesign, with the previous 3.8 L V6 version offered in some Electra models through model year 1988.

For the 1989 model year, in compliance with U.S. passive restraint standards, front seat-belts were door-mounted for the front outboard positions and three-point at the rear outboard positions. An optional remote keyless entry system with fob superseded the previously optional, sill-located, button-activated keyless entry. As a running change during the 1989 model year, Buick introduced the flagship Park Avenue Ultra trim. The Ultra featured silver lower body cladding replacing chrome trim, silver B-pillar overlay, trim-specific 15-inch alloy wheels, ant-lock brakes, trim-specific grille and C-pillar badging, vinyl roof with a "frenched" stitching and limousine-style rear window (as a no-cost option), leather trim on the steering wheel, all seat surfaces, door panels, rear pull straps, front and rear center arm rest and glove compartment door; dark burled wood trim; a package of 14 acoustic enhancements (at the roof, trunk floor, rear seat back, rear shelf, and rear shock wells), tinted glass marketed as "Soft-ray" glass; smoked tail lamps, silver accent body stripe; and a split front bench seat with a split frame design and dual 20-way adjustment, styled by Giorgetto Giugiaro — similarly marketed by Cadillac on their 1987–1989 Fleetwood Sixty Special model. Originally offered in six two-tone paint colors (one extra cost Firemist color) and four interior colors (blue, gray, red and beige), the Ultra offered a no-cost-delete vinyl roof, power moonroof, cornering lamps, automatic climate control, and Twilight Sentinel. The Ultra reached a production of 4,815 for 1989.

For the 1990 model year, standard equipment included a Delco radio with cassette and rear window defogger. Door secondary seals were revised to reduce wind noise, and windshield wiper system was made more robust. The bodywork received structural improvements, including at the upper rails; junction of upper rails and tie bars; front lower rails, rear rails as well as a wider floor pan center section.

For the 1991 model year, the C-body sedans were redesigned, with Buick retiring the Electra nameplate and making the Park Avenue a standalone model line rather than an Electra trim level.

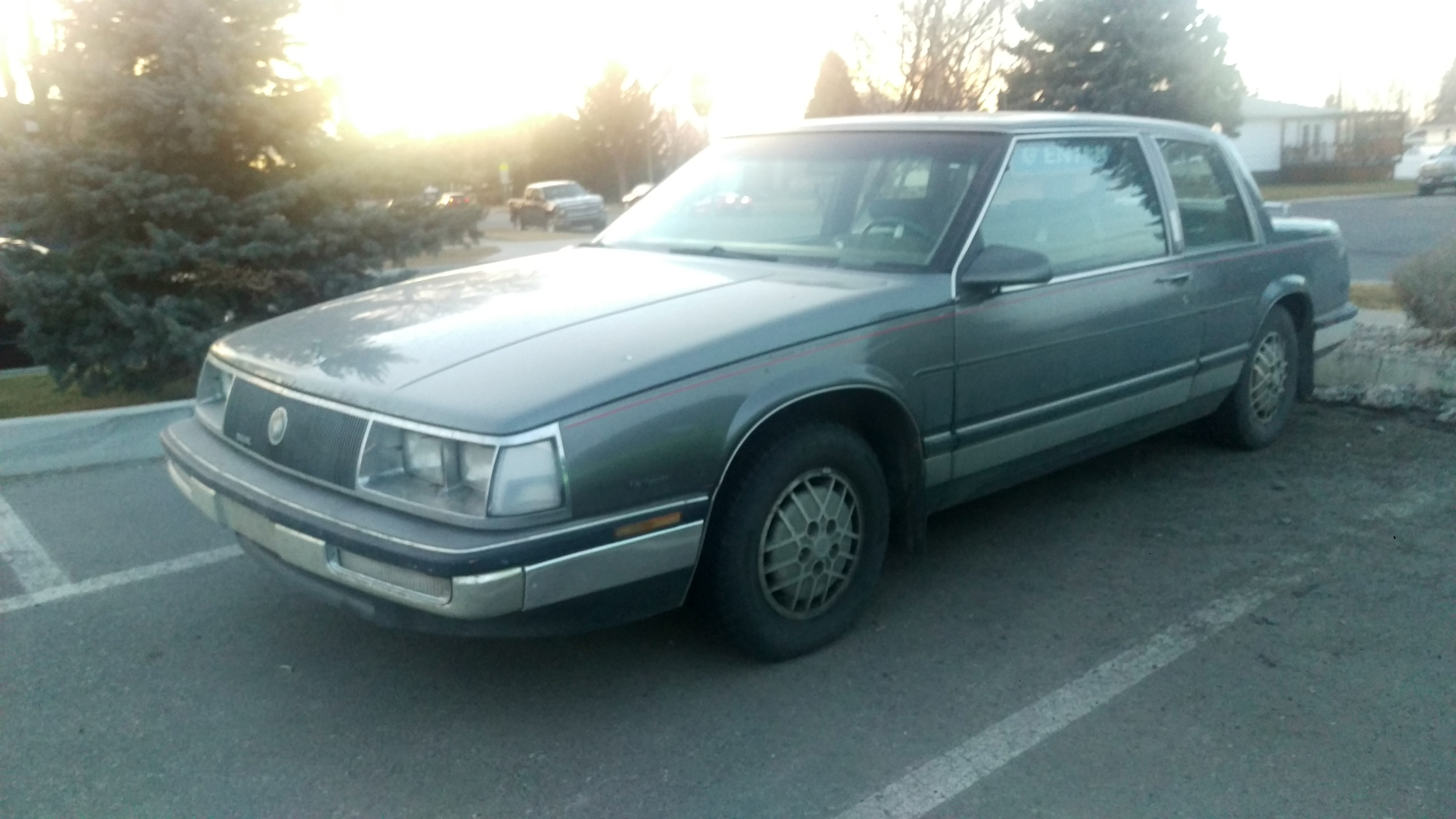
1985 Buick Electra Park Avenue coupe

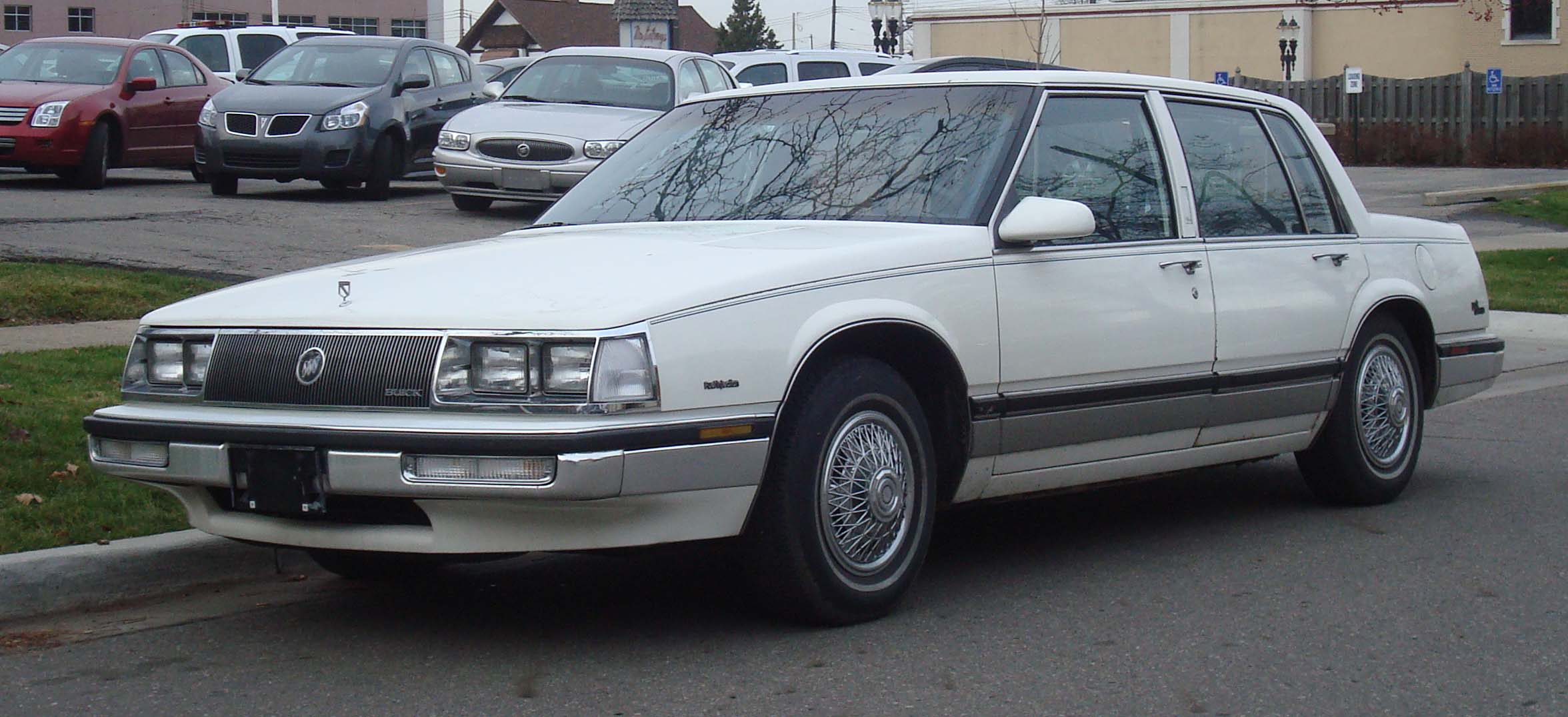
1985 Buick Electra Park Avenue sedan

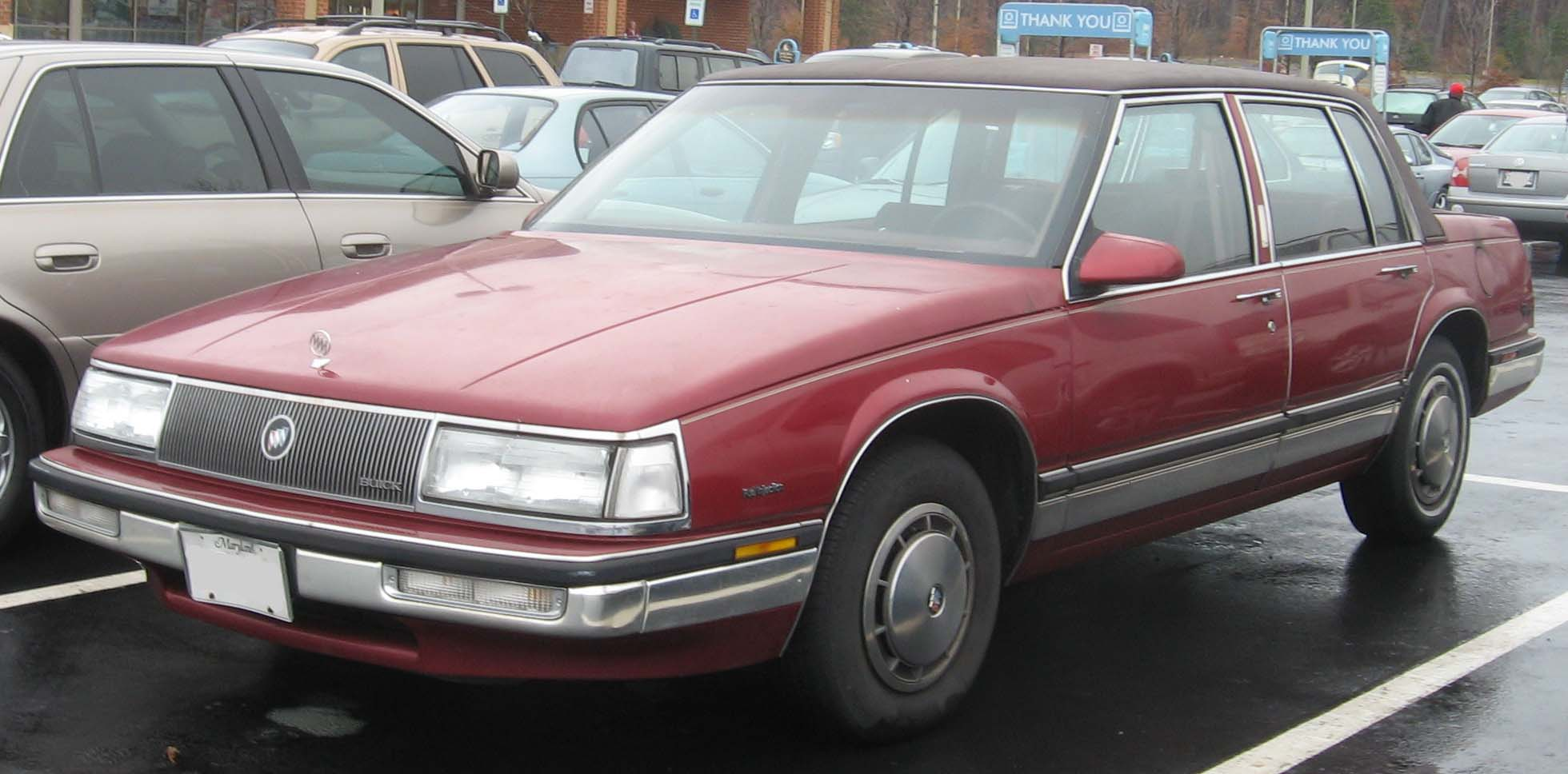
1988 Buick Electra Park Avenue sedan

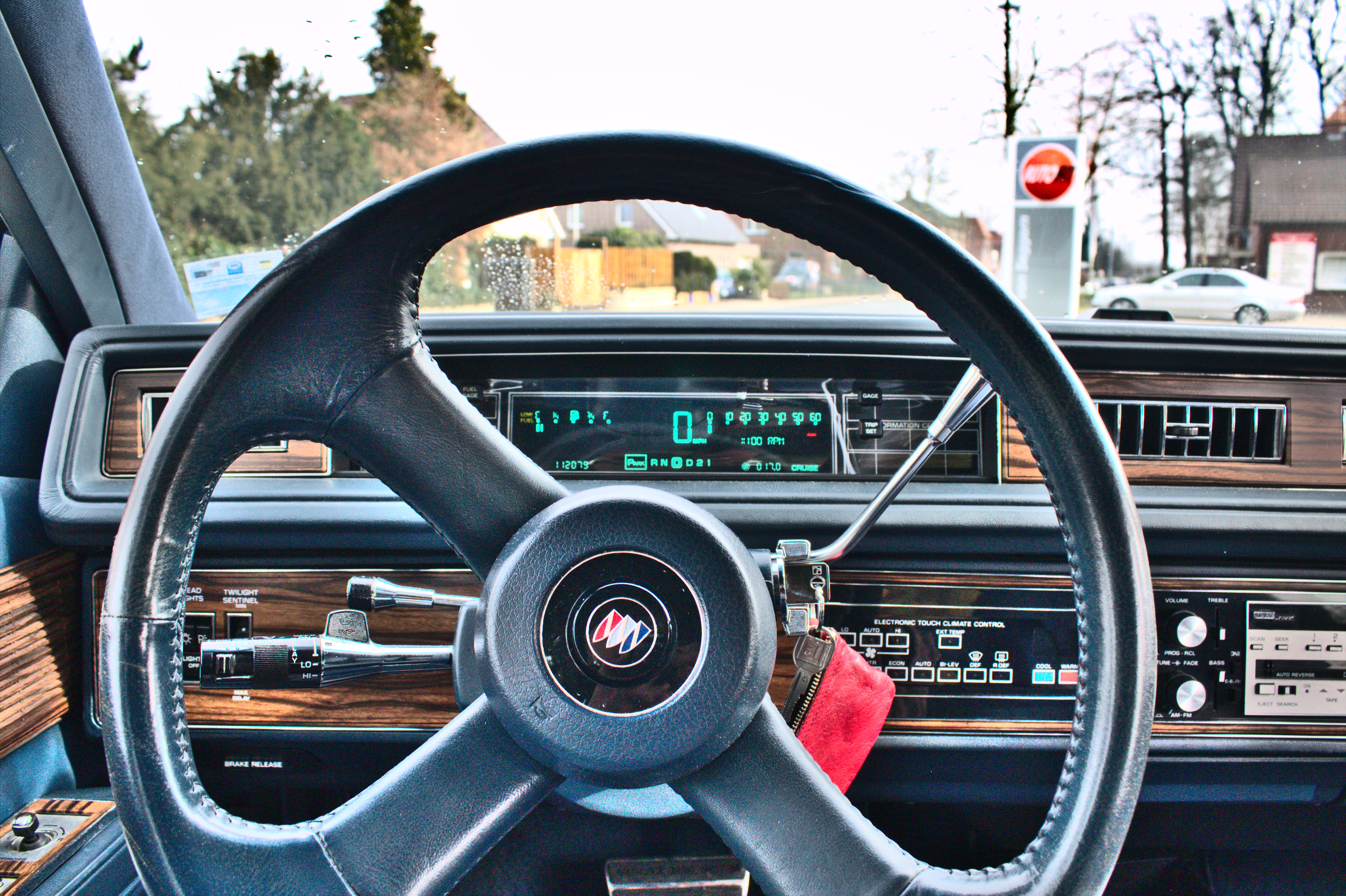
Dashboard, 1989 Buick Electra Park Avenue

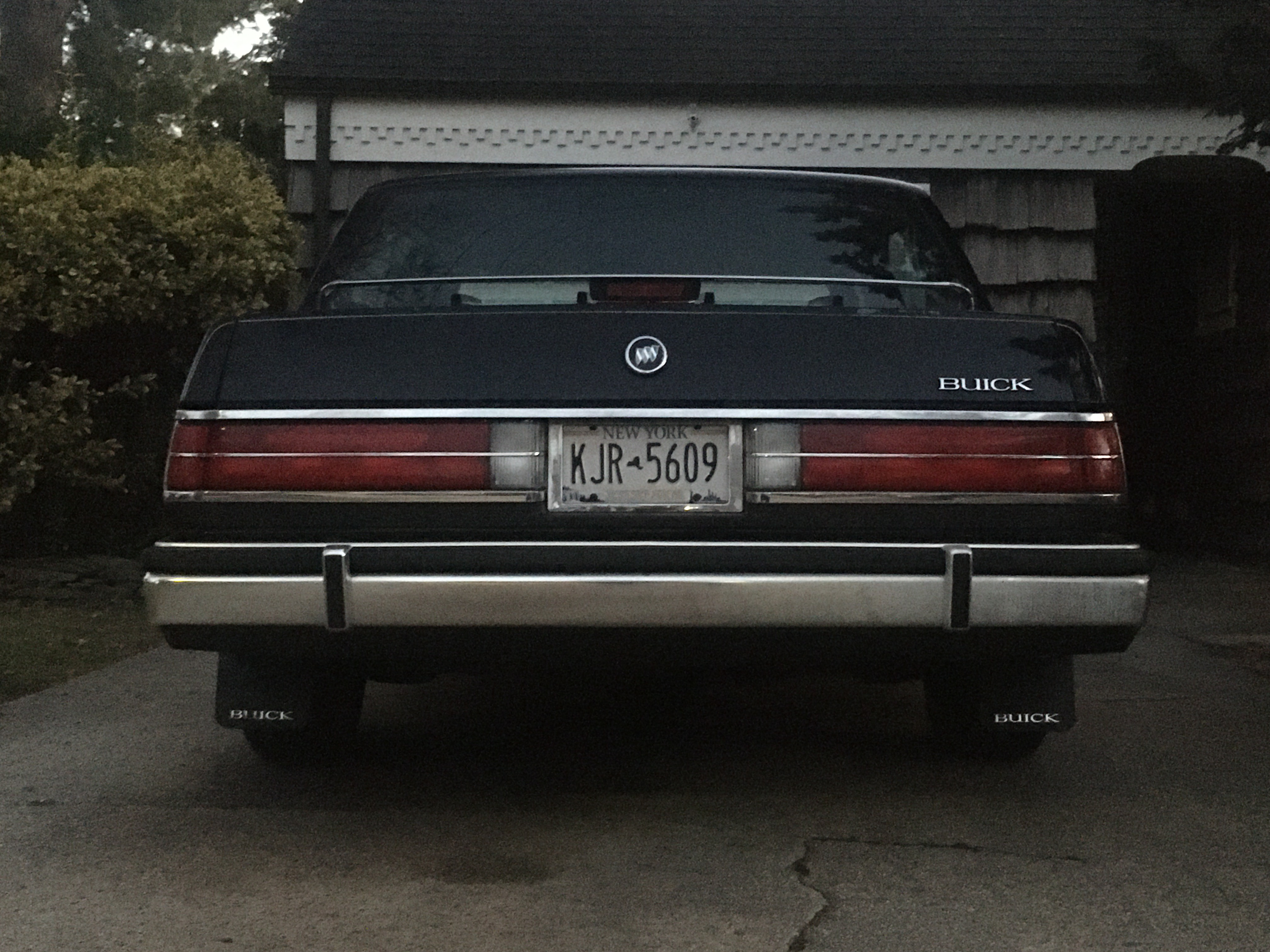
1987-1990 Electra Park Avenue (rear view)

=== Engines ===
The sixth-generation Buick Electra was introduced with three engines: the 110 hp 3.0-liter V6 (Electra 300) served as the standard engine, along with an optional 125 hp (93 kW) 3.8-liter V6 (Electra 380) and a 4.3-liter naturally-aspirated diesel V6 (Electra 430). For 1986, the 3.0 and 4.3-liter engines were dropped; the 3.8-liter V6 becoming the sole engine; and the 300/380/430 nomenclature was retired. The 3.8 was upgraded and now produced 150 hp (112 kW). For 1988, Buick introduced the LN3 3800 3.8L V6 – a major engine redesign, featuring a balance shaft and now producing 165 hp (123 kW) and 210 lb⋅ft (285 N⋅m). The previous 3.8 L V6 version was still offered in some Electra models through the 1988 model year, denoted by VIN code 3. Electras with the new 3800 V6 were designated by VIN code C.

- 3.0 L (181 cu in) Buick V6 – 1985 Electra 300, 110 hp (82 kW) at 4800 rpm, 145 lb⋅ft (197 N⋅m) at 2600 rpm
- 3.8 L (231 cu in) Buick V6 – 1985–1986 Electra 380, 1987–1990 Electra Limited, 1985–1990 Electra T-Type, 1985–1990 Electra Park Avenue, 1989–1990 Electra Park Avenue Ultra
- 4.3 L (263 cu in) Oldsmobile diesel V6 – 1985 Electra 430

1985–1990 Buick Electra production figures
Model year	Coupe	Sedan	T Type	Total
1985	5,852	126,367	4,644	136,863
1986	4,996	109,042	5,816	119,854
1987	4,084	83,387	2,570	90,041
1988	–	90,044	1,869	91,913
1989	–	82,415	1,151	83,566
1990	–	48,300	478	48,778
Total	14,932	539,555	16,528	571,015
