= List of GM bellhousing patterns =

The following is a list of General Motors' Bellhousing patterns, i.e. the unique mounting bolt hole pattern that matches specific engines.

== "V8 INDEPENDENCE" ERA (1949-1963) ==
The mid-century early V8 era was a time of fierce independence between GM divisions. Back then, each GM division acted like a separate company, with their own foundries, their own engineers, and their own pride. So, the 1949 to 1964 bellhousing patterns were very much unique designs.

=== Early Rocket/Cad "Extended Block" V8 patterns (1949-60) ===
The upper half of the bell was cast into the block. Olds & Cad patterns were similar.

- Oldsmobile Gen1 V8s (1949–60) 303, 324, early 371
- Cadillac 331 V8 (1949–54)

=== Buick Nailhead, Generation 1 pattern (1953-56) ===
Gen1 Nailheads had a unique round-shaped bellhousing that looks almost the same as bells for the later Gen2 Nailhead, but in fact the circular flange is about 1" larger.

=== Buick Nailhead, Generation 2 pattern (1957-66) ===
Gen2 Nailheads had a unique round-shaped bellhousing that looks almost the same as bells for the earlier Gen1 Nailhead, but in fact the circular flange is about 1" smaller.

=== Buick/Rover V8 pattern (1961-63/1967-2004) ===
- Buick/Oldsmobile/Pontiac 215 Aluminum V-8 (1961-1963)
- Buick 198 V6 (1962-1963)
- Rover V-8 (1967-2004) based on the Buick 215

=== Cadillac V8 pattern (1955-1967) ===
Early Cadillacs manufactured before 1967 used a "round top" bellhousing very similar to early Buicks; around 1965, the bellhousing pattern was revised until the BOP bolt pattern was adopted in 1968.

=== Oldsmobile (1961-1964) ===
Unique pattern, flush mount. Late 371 and 394 engines.

=== Pontiac V8 "Small Box" pattern (1955-1960) ===
Small Box Pontiac Bellhousings Comparison
Feature	Car	Truck
Clutch Capacity:	11 inch OD	12 inch OD
Volume:	Shallow	Deep
Chassis Mounts:	1955-57: L&R Bkt holes 1958-60: None^{1}	Left & right bracket holes
Clutch fork window:	fit car-specific Z-bars	fit truck-specific Z-bars
Transmission interface Bolt Pattern / Index Bore	1955-57: "Buick" / 4.062"; 1958-59: "Muncie" / 4.686"	"Muncie" / 4.686"

This is a 6-bolt pattern, with the two top bolts in the familiar Pontiac "twin peaks" positions (aka "saddle"), while the two lower, two middle,

and two 1/2" alignment pins in-between formed a rectangular pattern. The pattern is almost vertically symmetrical, but the lower driver's side bolt is inset slightly. All bells were cast iron, fastened with 7/16-14 UNC threaded bolts, typically 1-1/2 inches in overall length.

There were two designs, one for car and one for truck applications (Pontiac V8s were optional in 1955-1959 GMC Blue-Chip light trucks). Truck bells were designed to accommodate heavy-duty truck components including clutches, linkage, and transmissions.

1955-1957 car bells were machined to fit HD 6-bolt Buick 3-speed manual transmission bolt patterns and register hole diameters, while the others were machined for the "GM/Muncie"; both cars & trucks had bells for Hydramatics.

Early years used "1-2 Tricycle" powertrain mounting, with bracket holes cast into the bell. Pontiac cars transitioned to the modern "2-1 Taildragger" Powertrain mounting configuration starting 1958.^{1}

=== Pontiac V8 "pre-BOP" pattern (1961-1963) ===
Pontiac updated bells to GM corporate standards; 3/8-16UNC bolts and 5/8" alignment pins.

The two "twin peak" hole positions remain unchanged. Compared to the previous Small Box pattern, the mounting face widened, and the lower bolt holes and alignment pins moved farther apart, changing the 4 lower bolts outline from a "box" to a trapezoid. These changes were made to provide better stability for the larger transmissions being introduced (like the Slim Jim Hydramatic).

=== Chevrolet V8 pattern (1955-1996) ===
This was so named because it was introduced on the famous Small-block engine in 1955, then spread to Chevrolet's big-block V8 and more. Originally a 7-bolt pattern, the center bolt at the peak was eliminated for 1963. It became the longest lasting pattern, unaltered thru the first two generations of small-block (1996), with only minor modifications for generations III thru V (2025+).

- Chevrolet small-block V8s (Gen1 and Gen 2 LT1 & LT4)
- Chevrolet big-block V8s

- Chevrolet 153 Inline 4 (Chevy II, Vortec 3000/181 industrial/marine crate motor)
- Chevrolet Turbo-Thrift L6 (post-1962)
- GM Iron Duke RWD inline 4 (early RWD Variants with later use as a FWD pattern).

NOTE: 1980-1983 Jeeps equipped with the Iron Duke used a custom Chrysler 904 Torqueflite automatic transmission with an integral Chevrolet bellhousing.

- GM Vortec 4300 90° V6
- Detroit Diesel V8 6.2L and 6.5L
- Duramax V8

== STANDARDIZATION ==
Uni-bell fits BOP & Chevy blocks, Muncie & Ford gearboxes, and left or right mounted starters

GM divisions did not share a common bell housing interface until the introduction of the BOP (Buick, Oldsmobile, Pontiac) pattern in 1964. Except for remaining pre-1964 legacy engines, standardization amongst the BOP divisions was complete by 1965, with Cadillac joining in 1968. This reduced GM bellhousing patterns to just two (BOP & Chevrolet) until the GM Metric pattern was introduced in 1980.

Both the Chevy and BOP patterns are vertically symmetrical and share locations of their 2 bottom bolts and 2 locating pins; they differ in the locations of the 4 bolts above the pins. The BOP casting has distinct twin peaks containing the two top bolts, whereas the Chevy pattern has a single peak in the center. A few transmissions (TH200, TH350, & TH700R4), were produced with a hybrid "Uni-case"; these have a double set of upper bolt holes, allowing it to be bolted both to Chevy and BOP engines.

=== BOP (Buick, Oldsmobile, Pontiac) pattern (1964-90) ===
The BOP divisions (Buick, Oldsmobile, Pontiac) standardized on a common pattern in 1964 (older bells continued on pre-1964 legacy engines). Cadillac joined them in 1968.

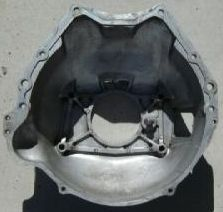
BOP V8 Pattern

Compared to the 1961-1963 "pre-BOP" Pontiac pattern, the 2 top bolts moved very slightly, but those below again were moved farther apart. The 2 lowest bolts and alignment pins were moved slightly to match coordinates with the Chevy pattern.

- Buick V6s (225 / 231 / 3.8) (1964-1988)
- Post-1963 Buick Small Block V8s (1964-1982)
- Buick Big Block V8s (1967-1976)
- Jeep "Dauntless" Buick engines: the 225 V6 (1967-1974) and 350 V8 (1969-1970)
- Cadillac cast iron V8s after 1967 (1968-85 472 and 500, 368 and 425)
- Oldsmobile Gen 2 V8s (1964-1990)
- Pontiac V8 engines (Some 1964 389s, all 1965-1981)

Starters are on the left (driver's) side on Olds 307-455 and Pontiac, and on the right (passenger) side on Cadillac 425/472/500 and Buick 225/231/3800/300/340/350/400/430/455.

== METRIC, SMALLER ENGINES, HEAVIER TRANSMISSIONS, & NVH (1980-present) ==
The next wave of bellhousings was prompted by the introduction of smaller/lighter engines and larger/heavier multispeed transmissions, Noise/Vibration/Harshness improvements, and the conversion to metric dimensions, beginning with introduction of the GM Metric pattern in 1980.

=== GM metric pattern (1980-2010) ===
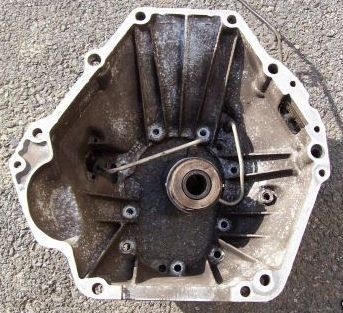

Also called the GM small corporate pattern and the S10 pattern

This pattern has a distinctive odd-sided hexagonal shape. Rear wheel drive applications have the starter mounted on the right side of the block (when viewed from the flywheel) and on the opposite side of the block compared to front wheel drive installations. The 2.2l S10/Sonoma had the starter located in the same position as front wheel drive cars. A rear wheel drive bellhousing is displayed at right, and the integrated front wheel drive bellhousing is displayed at the lower right (in this case, as a part of the GM 6T70 Transmission).

- GM 60-Degree 2.8/3.1/3.4/3.5/3.9 L V6 (also used by AMC)
- Buick 3300/3800 V6
- Cadillac HT4100/4.5/4.9 L V8
- Isuzu all 3.2 and 3.5L DOHC V6
- AMC/Chrysler 2.5L I4 found in Jeep Cherokee, Comanche, Wagoneer, CJ and Wrangler and Dodge Dakota
- GM Iron Duke/Tech-4 2.5L I4
- GM "122" 1.8/2.0/2.2 L I4
- GM 5.3L LS4 FWD V8
- GM High Value engine

=== GM Quad-4 pattern (1987-2002) ===
- GM Quad-4 family

=== Northstar pattern (1993-2011) ===
Nearly identical to the GM small corporate/metric pattern, except that the starter is located between the cylinder banks, and the lower right bolt hole is moved outward by roughly one inch. Being nearly identical, it too has the distinctive odd-sided hexagonal shape. These engines can be fitted in rear wheel drive vehicles with the right bellhousing and are used in hot rods, kit cars, sand rails and late model engine swaps.

- All Cadillac Northstar V8s
- Oldsmobile Aurora L47 V8
- GM 3.5L LX5 "Short Star" V6

=== GM LS metric V8 pattern (began 1997) ===
For GM small-block V8s, the Chevrolet SBC comprised the first two generations (Gen I/II), and the LS family was the next evolution that spanned third, fourth, and fifth generations. Technically, the "LS pattern" isn't completely new, but rather a significant revision of the 1955 Chevy pattern with three primary changes:

- Hole sizes were enlarged from 3/8 SAE to 10mm metric
- To make room for the LS engine's redesigned casting, the 2 o’clock bolt hole was removed

For 1997-2013 Gen III/IV (LS1, LS2, LS3, LS7):

- A top-center bolt hole was added at the 12 o’clock "peak" to increase block-to-transmission rigidity

In 2014, GM modified the pattern again for the 2014–present Gen V engines (LT1, L83, L86):

- The 12 o’clock bolt hole moved about an inch to the right.

NOTE: LS crankshaft flanges sit about 0.400 inches further forward (deeper into the block) than a SBC. attachment points for cast oil pans to lower bellhousing extensions, to reduce NVH.

=== GM Ecotec L4 DOHC pattern (2000-2019) ===
An example of this pattern can be seen to the right.

- GM Ecotec family (Generation I and II)
- GM LLT and late High Feature family

=== Atlas Inline 4/5/6 pattern (2002-2012) ===
Atlas family engines use a unique bellhousing pattern which no other GM motors share.

=== GM High Feature V6 60° DOHC pattern (2004-present) ===
In a 2004 move toward a global engine platform, GM introduced the High Feature V6 ("Alloytec" in Australia/Europe), used in everything from FWD Malibus to RWD Cadillacs and even mid-engine platforms. A new HFV6 bellhousing pattern brought improvements over the previous 1980 "GM Metric" design, including:

- more robust design handles higher torque with reduced NVH (Noise, Vibration, Harshness)
- ribbed casting on the transmission side to reinforce the larger bolt spread
- accommodates all-wheel-drive transfer cases and higher-output transmissions like the 6L80
- the bottom bolts directly into the engine's aluminum oil pan to create a rigid engine-transmission unit
- HFV6 starter pocket fits newer high-torque starters replacing the older bulkier permanent-magnet starters
- larger bolt spread with more "squared off" top pattern compared to the prior Metric bellhousing's semi-circular shape with two very close top bolts
- Cadilac 2.8
- Holden 3.2
- 3.0 LF1, LFW and 4TH generation LGW, LGY
- 3.6 LY7, LLT, LFX, LWR, LCS, LF3, LF4, LFR, LFY and 4TH generation LGX, LGZ

GM High Feature engine

=== GM Ecotec Gen III L4 DOHC pattern (2013-2025) ===
The completely re-engineered Generation III Ecotec includes a new uniquely shaped bellhousing pattern.
