= Muncie SM465 transmission =

Truck transmission built by GM

Muncie SM465
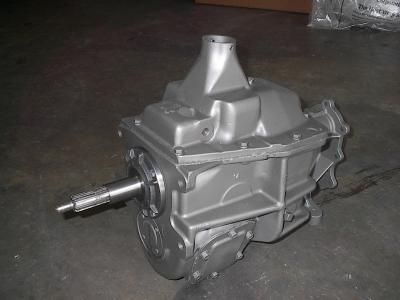

Overview
- Manufacturer: General Motors
- Production: 1968–1995

Body and chassis
- Class: 4-speed manual

Chronology
- Predecessor: SM420

The Synchro-mesh 465 or SM465 is a heavy-duty, four-speed manual transmission built by General Motors for use in light and medium duty trucks from 1968 to 1991 at the factory in Muncie, Indiana; it was designed to replace the somewhat similar Muncie SM420 transmission, which had been in production since just after World War II.

The SM465 can be found in Chevrolet and GMC full-size trucks, Blazers, Suburbans, among other models. Some applications beyond one-ton pickup trucks came with larger input shafts. Favored by off-road drivers, the SM465 has a very low first gear suitable for rock-crawling. The SM465 has developed a reputation as a highly durable transmission. For the 1992 model-year, the SM465 was replaced in 3/4- and 1-ton pickup truck applications by the New Venture Gear 4500 transmission.

== Design ==
GM literature also often referred to this as a CH465, referencing Chevrolet.

Gear ratios are:

- First - 6.55:1
- Second - 3.58:1
- Third - 1.70:1
- Fourth - 1.00:1
- Reverse - 6.09:1

The SM465 features dual provisions for power take-offs. The 1988-91 versions have an aluminum top with improved shift feel. The 1985 and newer versions utilize a hydraulic clutch release, replacing a mechanical linkage in older versions. A common wear factor in the form of abuse leads to having to manually hold the gear selector in third.

There have been three different output shafts for pickup trucks. Early four-wheel drive was a short 10 spline. Later, a 35-spline version was for 2 wheel drive, whereas 4WD units had a 32-spline output shaft. The SM465 was the only manual transmission available for 1988-1991 R/V-series trucks and SUVs.

== See also ==
- Muncie SM420 transmission
