= Buick V8 engine =

Buick V8 engines
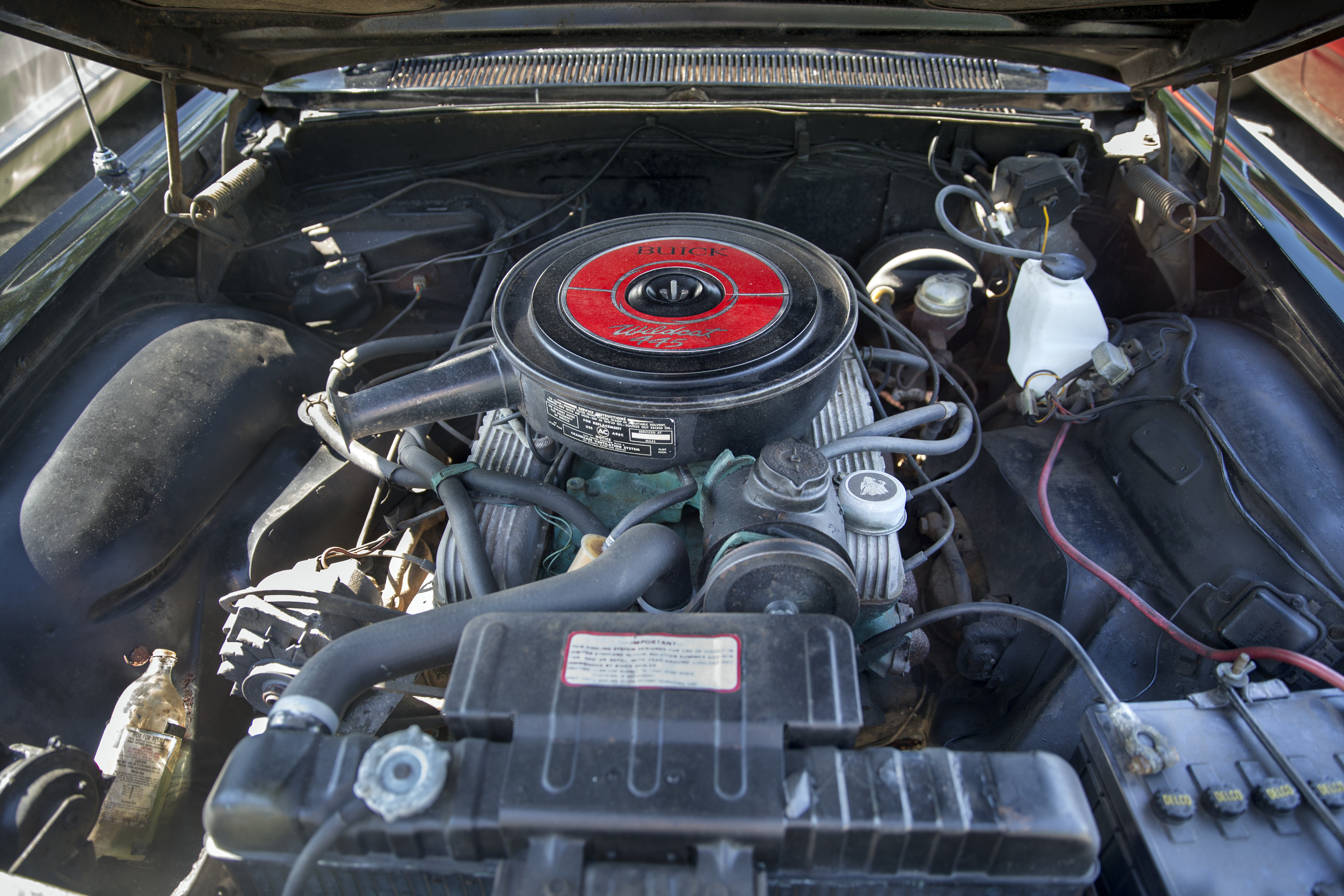
- 401 cu in "Nailhead" in a 1964 Buick Wildcat

Overview
- Manufacturer: Buick (General Motors)
- Also called: Fireball V8 (nickname); Nailhead (1953–1966)
- Production: 1953–1981 Buick City (engine block and heads); Saginaw Metal Casting Operations

Layout
- Configuration: 90º V8
- Displacement: 215–455 cu in (3.5–7.5 L)
- Cylinder bore: 3.5–4.31 in (88.9–109.5 mm)
- Piston stroke: 2.8–3.9 in (71.1–99.1 mm)
- Cylinder block material: Cast iron, Aluminum
- Cylinder head material: Cast iron, Aluminum
- Valvetrain: OHV 2 valves x cyl.
- Compression ratio: 8.8:1–11.0:1

Combustion
- Fuel system: Carter AFB or Rochester carburetors
- Fuel type: Gasoline
- Cooling system: Water-cooled

Output
- Power output: 150–360 hp (112–268 kW)
- Torque output: 220–510 lb⋅ft (298–691 N⋅m)

Dimensions
- Dry weight: 318–467 lb (144–212 kg)

Chronology
- Predecessor: Buick straight-eight
- Successor: GM LT engine; GM LS engine

The Buick V8 is a family of V8 engines produced by the Buick division of General Motors (GM) between 1953 and 1981. All were 90° water-cooled V8 OHV naturally aspirated engines.

== Development ==
Buick had produced only inline engines (4-, 6-, and 8-cylinder) since 1903, but development of its first V8 began in 1944, and the new engine debuted in its 1953 cars following an accumulated million road-test miles. Buick stated that the engine was designed to "powerful, efficient, smooth, quiet, durable, and easily serviced", but need to be "realized with the lightest and most compact package which we could produce, consistent with minimum manufacturing cost". Other designs were abandoned because of space requirements. Buick’s move from inline engines to 90-degree V-engines created under hood clearance concerns, especially on the steering-gear side. The new engine’s oversquare design (0.8:1 stroke/bore ratio) and “vertical, in-line positioning of the valves”, however, minimized overall engine width. This, plus a one-inch increase in front tread in its new 1953 models, “permitted the continuation of all chassis improvements developed with the former in-line engine.”

Buick’s engine designers considered it necessary that combustion chambers have a centrally located spark plug, and their new V-8 was “more nearly centrally located than in any other American automobile engine.” Inline valves were retained from Buick’s inline-8cyl. in the 1953 V-8 “chiefly to make the engine more compact, to save weight, and to facilitate manufacture.” The new engine’s exhaust valve was smaller than in competitors’ large V-8s, and Buick stated that “a smaller valve opening earlier and higher can duplicate ... the opening area of a larger valve with the added advantage that flow efficiency is maintained by avoiding the sudden expansion into a large port” and "made a more compact combustion chamber possible, improved valve cooling, and reduced cost, without entailing any loss of power. The reduced valve weight brought the exhaust pump-up speed well above that of the inlet valve, thus providing insurance against exhaust valve breakage."

Compared to the then-current 300-plus cubic inch engines from Chrysler, and GM's other brands, Buick’s new powerplant was shorter, narrower, weighed less, and had a lighter crankshaft. The new engine was manufactured with compression ratios of 8:1 and 8.5:1, higher than 1953 Chrysler models.

== Evolution ==
The Buick V8 family can be divided into three groupings: "Nailheads", produced between 1953 and 1966, which came in two generations using different blocks in displacements from 264–425 cu in (4.3–7.0 L), and are known for their unique valve design and head configuration; "small blocks" produced from 1961 to 1982 in displacements from 215–350 cu in (3.5–5.7 L); and "big blocks" produced from 1967 to 1976 in displacements from 400–455 cu in (6.6–7.5 L).

The use of "small-block" and "big-block" terminology refers to the respective engine block's bore spacing, external dimensions, and weight, not internal engine displacement.

The "Nailhead" nickname derives from the unusually long, small valves of the original Buick V8, a function in part of the unusual horizontal positioning of the engine's heads.

Even though they are not generally held to be, by some important empirical measures, including a deck height that allowed displacement to grow to 425 cu in (7.0 L), the Buick "Nailhead" engines can be regarded as "big block" - a term that did not exist in that usage until exceptionally large displacement V8s with correspondingly large blocks began to appear and be distinguished from their more moderate-sized predecessors. The term "small-block" is a retronym, developed to distinguish engines with small and medium blocks from the very large block engines being introduced in response to increasing automobile size and the "horsepower wars" of the 1960s.

Both the Nailheads and the mid 1960s-on "big-block" engines shared a 4.75 in (121 mm) bore spacing. The Buick "small-block", which predated the "big-block", had its own block and bore spacing. Both "big-" and "small-block" engines were clean sheet designs.

Some Buick V8s, such as the 350, 400, and 455, have the same displacements as V8s of other GM divisions, but they are entirely different designs. Buick Nailhead V8s can be distinguished by the top surfaces of their valve covers being horizontal (parallel to the ground). Later Buick small and big block V8s have a front-mounted distributor tilted to the drivers side (like Cadillacs), but siamesed center exhaust ports (unlike Cadillacs).

== Nailhead ==
Buick produced two generations of "Nailhead" engine, serially between 1953 and 1966. The first spanned 1953-1956, in two displacements: the original 322 cu in (5.3 L) from 1953 to 1956, and a de-bored "junior" 264 cu in (4.3 L) version only in 1954 and 1955. The second spanned 1957-1966, with an original 364 cu in (6.0 L) displacement produced 1957-1961, a 401 cu in (6.6 L) from 1959-1966, and a final 425 cu in (7.0 L) from 1963 to 1966. All second generation engines used the same block, bore spacing, and different combinations of bore and stroke. All Nailheads had cast iron blocks and heads. Both generation's vertical valve arrangement resulted in unusually compact V8s of their displacement.

The two engines shared a similar valve architecture but were different designs with different blocks. Among the changes in the second generation were larger, less-restrictive valves and ports, a better flowing manifold, thinner castings for both block and heads, new 1.6:1 rocker arms, increasing valve lift, more radical camshafts with increased duration.

=== First-generation ===
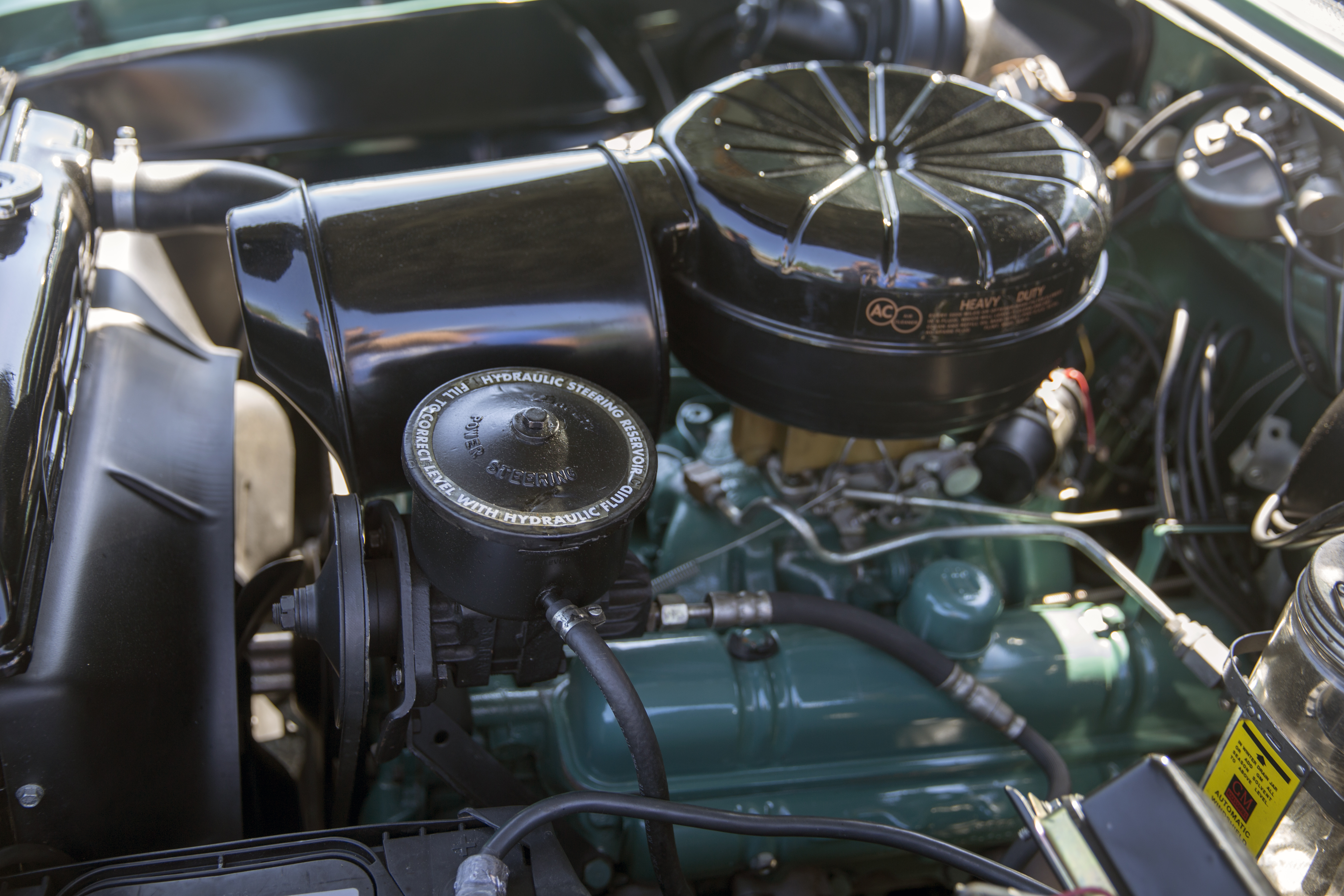
The 322 Fireball V8 in a 1956 Buick Century

Buick's first generation V8 was offered from 1953 through 1956; it replaced the Buick straight-eight. While officially called the "Fireball V8" by Buick, it became known by enthusiasts as the "Nailhead" for the unusual vertical alignment of its small-sized valves (Originally it was known to hot-rodders as the "nail valve", because the engine's small heads contained valves with long stems, which made them look like nails.)

During this era, Buick ranked smoothness above most other marketing objectives, and the Dynaflow transmission's non-shifting design was demonstrably smoother than the other rough shifting automatics then available. With the Dynaflow, a high torque engine was needed to provide adequate acceleration, so that's what the Nailhead was designed to deliver.

Both the intake and exhaust valves were on the intake manifold side of a "pent-roof combustion chamber". To offset restrictive port diameters and the smaller-sized valves [1.75 in (44 mm) intake, 1.25 in (32 mm) exhaust], the Nailhead V8s used a camshaft with greater lift and duration. The small-diameter intake runners allowed these engines to develop high torque, with many exceeding 1 ft-lb/cu in (exceptional for the time).

First-generation Nailheads were painted "Late" Buick Green (also called Apple Green, used from 1953 to 1956).

==== 264 ====
The 264 cu in (4.3 L) followed the 322 as a junior V8 produced in 1954 and 1955 as a direct replacement for the smaller Buick 263 straight-eight, and was the only engine available in Buick's economy "Special" series vehicles. It was the smallest displacement Nailhead, sharing stroke and deck height with the 322, but having a smaller 3.625 in (92.1 mm) bore.

==== 322 ====
The larger 322 cu in (5.3 L) was the original Nailhead, used by Buick from 1953 through 1956 in the Roadmaster, Super, and Century models, and the Special in 1956. It has a bore and stroke of 4 in × 3.2 in (101.6 mm × 81.3 mm).

The 322 was also used in the 1956 through 1957 10,000-Series conventional-cab Chevrolet heavy duty trucks labeled as the Loadmaster.

=== Second-generation ===
Buick's second variation of the "Nailhead" was produced from 1957–1966. The "Fireball" name was dropped after 1957, but the 364 was very briefly called the "B-12000", referring to the 12,000 pounds of force generated by each piston. Second generation Nailheads were painted "Late" Buick Green, with the exception of those installed in the 1963 Riviera, which were silver, and the 1966 Riviera, which were red.

==== 364 ====
Buick, like most of its competitors, continued to expand its V8 engine to larger displacements. The 364 cu in (6.0 L) was introduced in 1957 and produced through 1961, with a 4.125 in × 3.4 in (104.8 mm × 86.4 mm) bore and stroke. All other models got the 300 hp (224 kW) four-barrel engine except for the lower level Special series, which received a 250 hp (186 kW) two-barrel carburetor version.

==== 401 (400) ====
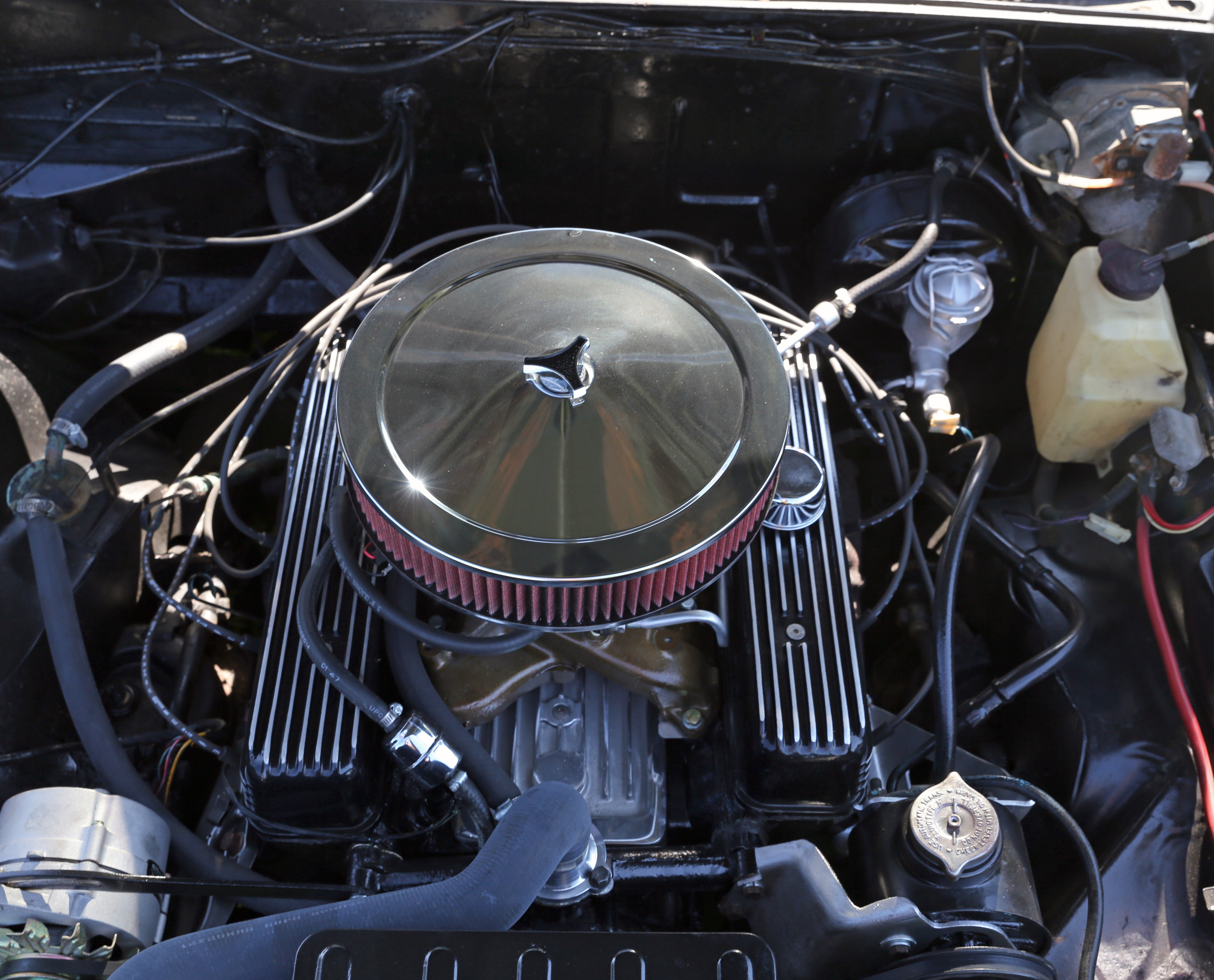
1963 401 Buick V8. Note the horizontal valve covers, and how narrow the engine is for a large displacement V8

The 364 was enlarged to 401 cu in (6.6 L) and produced from 1959 to 1966. Both bore and stroke were enlarged, to 4.1875 by 3.64 inches (106.36 mm × 92.46 mm) respectively. Originally sold as a 401, it was later redesignated "400" (with no change to displacement) to meet a 1960s Division-wide GM directive mandating a maximum allowable 400 cu in (6.6 L) displacements in mid-size cars.

The 401/400 became Buick's original muscle car powerplant, used in the company's Skylark Gran Sport, Buick Sport Wagon and Buick Wildcat models, among others. The engine was variously designated the Wildcat 375, Wildcat 410, and Wildcat 445 - with the numbers corresponding with the torque produced by each version. The Wildcat 410 was the two-barrel carbureted engine, standard on the 1962-1963 LeSabre. The Wildcat 375 was a no-cost economy option for the 1962-1963 LeSabre that used a lower compression ratio to run on mid-octane rather than premium fuel. The various Wildcat engines had decals on their air cleaners indicating their version; however, a later four-barrel edition of the 1966-1967 small-block 340 cu in (5.6 L) Buick 340 V8 was also labeled Wildcat 375 on its air cleaner.

The single four-barrel Wildcat 445 was the standard engine in the Invicta, 1959-1966 Electra, 1962–1966 Buick Wildcat, 1963 Riviera, and 1965 Riviera.

==== 425 ====
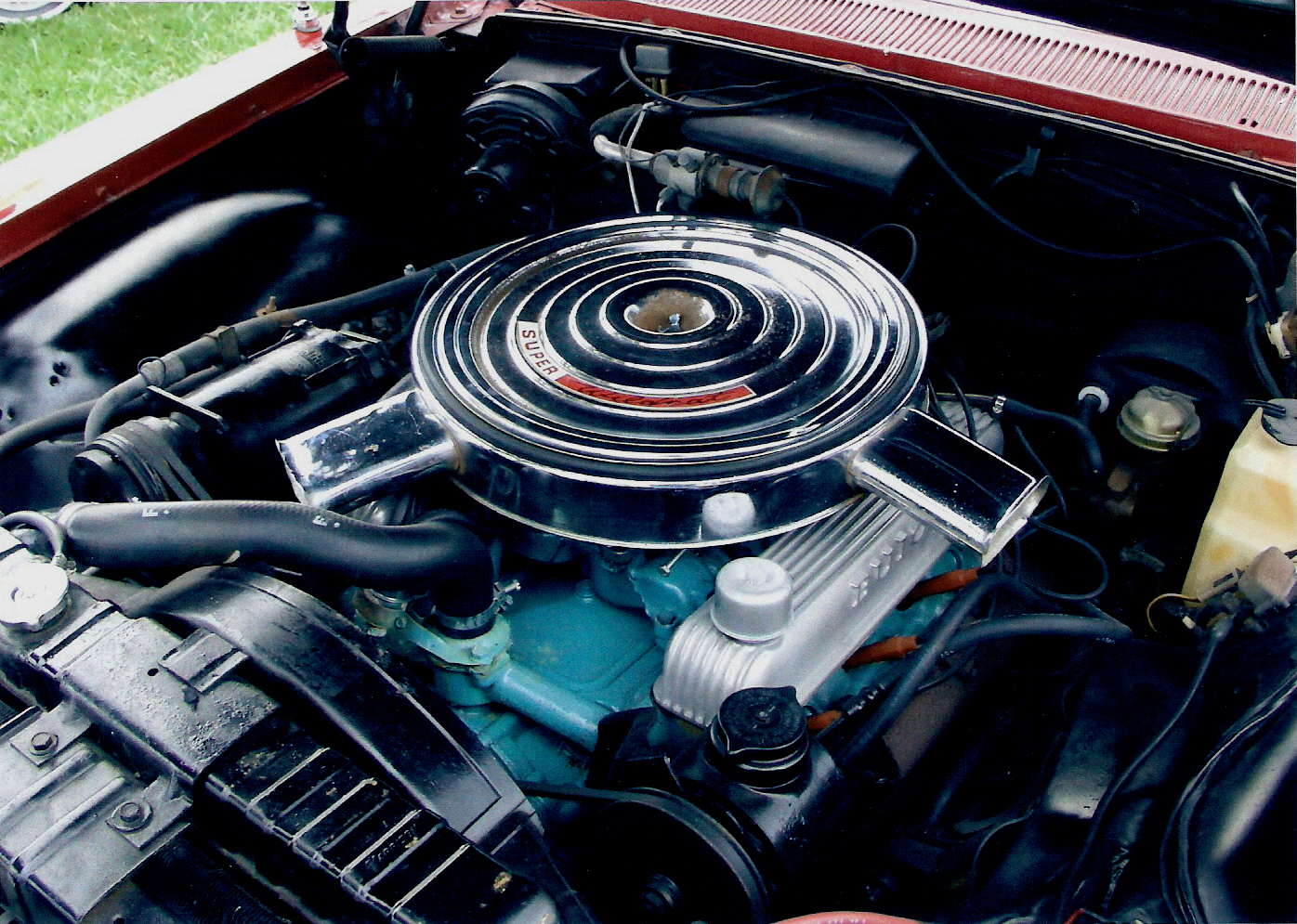
Super Wildcat 425 cu in (7.0 L) 390 hp (291 kW) engine

The 425 cu in (7.0 L), the largest-displacement Nailhead, was produced from 1963 to 1966. Its bore and stroke measure 4.3125 by 3.64 inches (109.54 mm × 92.46 mm). It began as an exclusive option on the 1963 Riviera, and was later available on the Wildcat and Electra models. It was standard on the 1964 and 1966 Rivieras.

The basic 425, called the Wildcat 465 for the lb-ft of torque it developed, came with a single four-barrel carburetor. The Super Wildcat featured two four-barrel carburetors and matching intake manifold, was available on the 1964 Riviera as a factory option (2,122 produced), 1964 Electras (any model, production numbers unknown), 1965 Riviera Gran Sport, and 1966 Wildcat GS,

Coded "MW", these Regular Production Option {RPO}-code Y48 parts were delivered in the car's trunk for dealer installation. Toward the end of the 1966 model year, around May 1966, Buick offered the Super Wildcat 465 with factory-installed dual four-barrel Carter AFB carburetors as an "MZ" option. Only 179 of the 1966 Riviera GS models were built with the MZ package.

Mounted on a trolley, Buick 425s were also used as starter motors for the SR-71 Blackbird supersonic jet.

== Small-block ==
Buick introduced a 215 cu in (3.5 L) "small block" V8 in 1961, an industry-first all-aluminum design. It included an aluminum timing cover that integrated a forward-mounted distributor and external oil pump, which exposed the pump and oil filter to incoming air for added cooling. It had a 4.24 in (107.7 mm) cylinder bore spacing, and used a new bellhousing pattern.

After three years of persistent cylinder liner issues in the aluminum blocks, cheaper new thin-wall iron casting techniques led to a change to an iron casting in 1964. Along with this change was a switch to the new standardized BOP bellhousing pattern. The iron casting was used for three displacements (300, 340, and 350 cu in).

Buick small-block 300's were painted "Late" Buick Green. 1966 340 and subsequent engines were painted red from 1967-1974, medium metallic blue from 1975-1977, and light blue from 1978-1982.

=== 215 ===
See also Rover V8 engine

GM experimented with aluminum engines starting in the early 1950s, when Aluminum Company of America (ALCOA) was pushing all automakers to use more aluminum. An early-development was a supercharged 215-cubic-inch (3.5 L) V8 used in the 1951 Le Sabre concept car, and the 1953 Buick Roadmaster concept car. That design is unrelated to the 215 cu in all-aluminum V8 introduced by Buick in 1961.

GM designated Buick as engine design leader, and work on a production small displacement aluminum V8 commenced in 1956. Originally intended to displace 180-cubic-inch (2.9 L), Buick increased this to 215-cubic-inch (3.5 L) to be more compatible with the new Y-body cars on the drawing board, introduced for 1961 as the Skylark.

Known as the Buick Fireball, the all-aluminum 215 had a strongly oversquare bore and stroke of 3.5 in × 2.8 in (88.9 mm × 71.1 mm), for an actual displacement of 215.51 cu in (3,532 cc). With a Rochester 2GC (2 Jet) two-barrel carburetor and 8.8:1 compression ratio power output was 150 hp (112 kW) at 4400 rpm and 220 lb⋅ft (298 N⋅m) of torque at 2,400 rpm. Weighing only 318 lb (144 kg), it was the world's lightest mass-production V8. Measuring 28 in (71 cm) long, 26 in (66 cm) wide, and 27 in (69 cm) high, it became standard equipment in the 1961 Buick Special.

Power was raised soon after introduction to 155 hp (116 kW) at 4,600 rpm. A Buick Special Skylark version was introduced mid-year, which had 10.0:1 compression and a four-barrel carburetor, raising output to 185 hp (138 kW) at 4,800 rpm and 230 lb⋅ft (312 N⋅m) at 2,800 rpm.

For 1962, the two-barrel engine was unchanged, while the four-barrel engine's compression ratio was increased to 10.25:1 and output to 190 hp (142 kW) at 4,800 rpm and 235 lb⋅ft (319 N⋅m) at 3,000 rpm. For 1963, the four-barrel was bumped to 11.0:1 compression and an even 200 hp (149 kW) at 5,000 rpm and 240 lb⋅ft (325 N⋅m) at 3,200 rpm, 0.93 hp (0.7 kW)/cu in. The higher output "Power Pack" was equipped with higher lift camshaft .0.518" intake/ 0.523" exhaust with increased duration 305/310 and required 99 research octane fuel.

==== Pontiac usage ====
Pontiac used the Buick version of the 215 in its Y-body cars, the Tempest and LeMans. At that time the engine was closely associated with the Buick brand, and Pontiac sold few cars with it, using it only in 1961 and 1962.

==== Oldsmobile version ====
Although sharing basic architecture with the Buick, Oldsmobile developed its own all-aluminum 215, the "Rockette V8", to install in its F-85 Cutlass Y-body. Its angled valve covers were designed by Oldsmobile engineers to look like a traditional Olds V8.

Olds also released a turbocharged version, the 215 hp (160 kW) Turbo-Rocket, in its 1962–63 Oldsmobile Jetfire. Together with Chevrolet's turbocharged 1962 Corvair Spyder, these were the first turbochargers ever offered in passenger cars.

Produced on a separate assembly line, the Olds 215 was somewhat heavier at 350 lb (160 kg). Oldsmobile added a sixth head bolt on the intake manifold side in an effort to alleviate a head-warping problem on high-compression versions. This meant that the five-bolt Buick heads would fit on Oldsmobile blocks, but not vice versa. The Oldsmobile used wedge-shaped/quench combustion chambers/pistons that allowed larger valves, while the Buick had a 37-cc wedge combustion chamber and used "dished head" pistons. Altering the compression ratio on the Oldsmobile 215 required changing the heads, but on a Buick 215, only the pistons were changed, which was less expensive and simpler.

==== Discontinuation ====
Casting-sealing technology was not advanced enough at that time, and hidden porosity problems caused serious oil leaks, producing an abnormally high scrap ratio. The factory had to make extensive use of air gauging for leak checks, and was unable to detect leaks on blocks that were as much as 95% complete. This raised the cost of complete engines to more than that of a comparable all cast-iron engine, so aluminum blocks were cancelled after the 1963 model year. Another problem was clogged radiators from antifreeze mixtures incompatible with aluminum.

==== Racing ====
The 215's very high power-to-weight ratio made it immediately interesting for automobile and boat racing. Mickey Thompson entered a stock-block 215-powered car in the 1962 Indianapolis 500, the first stock-block engine since 1946 and the only non-Offenhauser-powered entry in the race. Rookie driver Dan Gurney qualified eighth and raced well for 92 laps before retiring with transmission problems.

Surplus engine blocks of the Oldsmobile F85 version formed the basis of the Australian Formula One Repco V8 used by Brabham to win the 1966 Formula One world championship, although only the earliest engines had any Oldsmobile components. The majority of Repco RB620 engines were cast and built in-house at Repco.

==== Sale to Rover ====
Rights to the Buick 215 engine were purchased by the British Rover Company and used in the 1967 Rover P5B that replaced the 3 L straight six Rover engined P5. Throughout the years, the Rover Company (which became part of British Leyland in 1968), and its successor companies constantly improved the engine making it much stronger and more reliable. Capacities ranged from 3.5 to 5.0 L (215 to 307 cu in). The engine was also used in a variety of British Leyland/MG Rover Group cars, including MG, Triumph, and Range Rover. It has also been licensed to specialist British manufacturers such as Morgan and TVR. The engine remains well-supported by enthusiast clubs, specialist parts suppliers, and by shops that specialize in conversions and tuning.

=== 300 ===
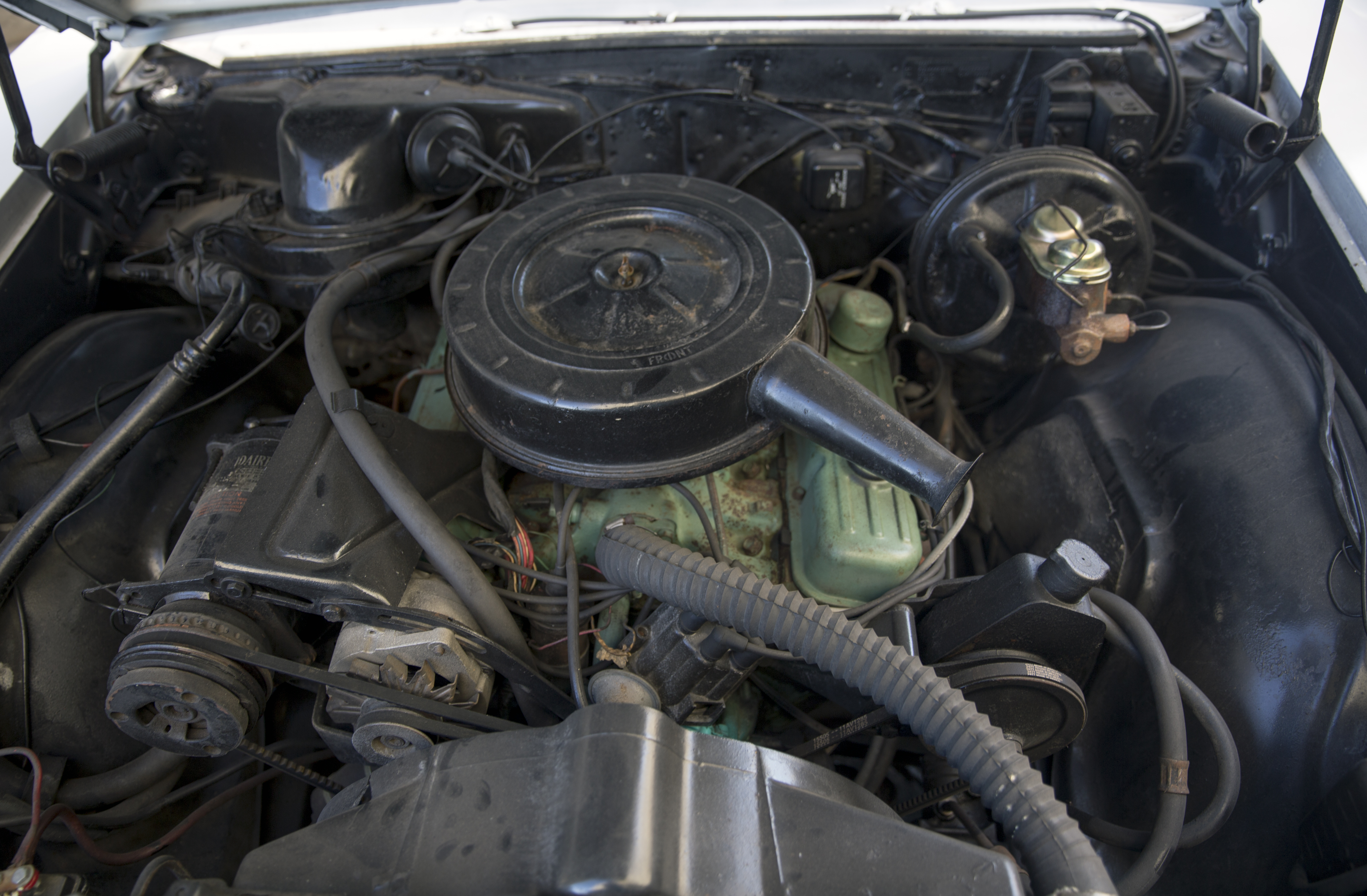
A 300 ci Buick V8 in a 1967 Skylark

In 1964, Buick replaced the 215 with an iron-block engine of very similar architecture. The new "small block" engine had a bore of 3.75 in (95.3 mm) and a stroke of 3.4 in (86.4 mm) for a displacement of 300.4 cu in (4.9 L; 4,923 cc). It retained the aluminum cylinder heads, intake manifold, and accessories of the 215 for a dry weight of 405 lb (184 kg). The 300 was offered in two-barrel form, with 9.0:1 compression, making 210 hp (157 kW) at 4600 rpm and 310 lb⋅ft (420 N⋅m) at 2400 rpm, and four-barrel form, with 11.0:1 compression, making 250 hp (186 kW) at 4800 rpm and 355 lb⋅ft (481 N⋅m) at 3000 rpm.

For 1966, the 300 switched to cast-iron heads, raising dry weight to 467 lb (212 kg), still quite light for a V8 engine of its era. The four-barrel option was cancelled for 1966, and the 300 was replaced entirely by the 350 in 1968.

In 1964, while nearly all Buick engines were painted "Buick Late Green", the 300 V8s were painted silver instead. In 1966 Buick engines switched to "Buick Late Red", but until 1967 at least, the 300 V8 (and the 225) were still painted Buick Late Green. The Apollo 5000 GT sports car, (also sold as the Vetta Ventura) used this engine.

=== 340 ===
In 1966, the 300's stroke was increased to 3.85 in (97.8 mm) in a raised block to create the 340, displacing 340.2 cu in (5.6 L; 5,574 cc), as a replacement for the four-barrel-carbureted 300. The taller deck (raised by 0.5625 in (14.3 mm) compared to the 215/300's) meant the intake manifold was of a new design to bolt to the otherwise interchangeable cylinder heads.

It was offered with two- or four-barrel carburetion, the two-barrel with a 9.0:1 compression rated at 220 hp (164 kW) at 4,000 rpm and 340 lb⋅ft (461 N⋅m) at 2,400 rpm, and the four barrel with 10.25:1 compression, rated at 260 hp (194 kW) at 4,000 rpm and 375 lb⋅ft (508 N⋅m) at 2,800 rpm. It was only produced through 1967, being replaced by the new small block 350 cu in (5.7 L) in 1968.

=== 350 ===
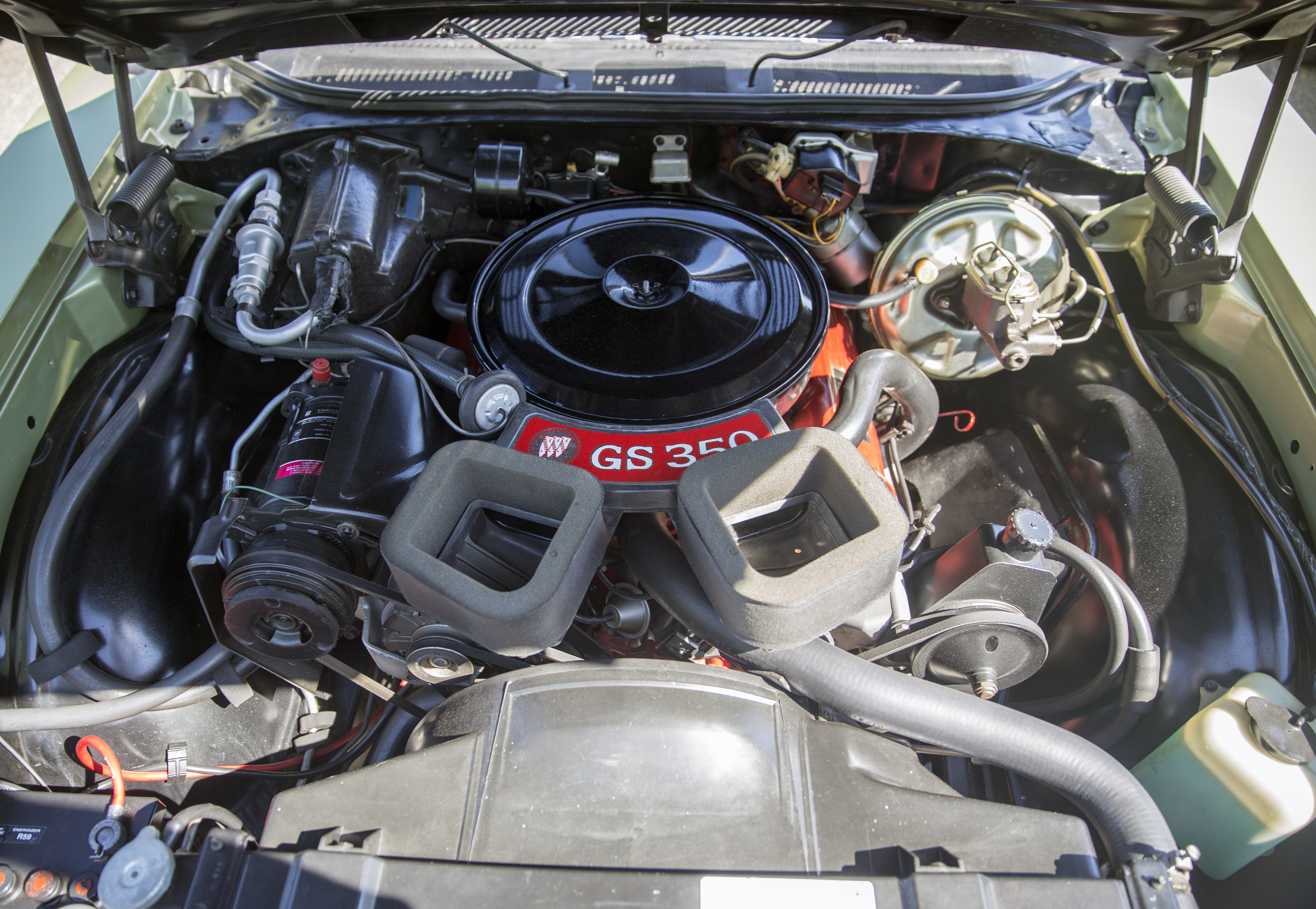
A 350 in a 1969 Buick Gran Sport

Buick adopted the popular 350 size in 1968 for their final family of V8 engines, which was produced through 1980. Although it shared the displacement of the other GM small blocks, including the contemporary Chevrolet 350, Oldsmobile 350, and Pontiac 350, the Buick blocks were of a substantially different proprietary company design. The Buick 350 featured the same 3.8 in (96.5 mm) bore as the 231 cu in (3.8 L) version of the Buick 90° V6 and retained the 3.85 in (97.8 mm) stroke of the previous 340 cu in (5.6 L) V8. The exact displacement is 349.31 cu in (5,724 cc).

The major differences of the 350 in comparison to other GM V8s are Buick's "deep-skirt" engine block construction, the use of cast iron with increased nickel content, under-square cylinder bore sizing, 3 in (76.2 mm) crankshaft main journals, and 6.385 in (162.2 mm) connecting rods. Of all the GM "350s", the Buick has the longest piston stroke, essentially the same as the Buick big-blocks, which have the shortest stroke of the GM big-blocks. The engine garnered a reputation as rugged and durable, and some of its design characteristics are found in other Buick-designed GM engines, such as the 231 cu in (3.8 L) V6 and its 3800 descendants.

The 350 was used by Kaiser-Jeep and AMC Jeep in the Jeep Gladiator and Wagoneer models from 1968–71; in these applications, the engine was billed as the Dauntless V8.

Applications:
- 1968-1972 Buick Skylark
- 1968-1972 Buick Sport Wagon
- 1968-1971 Jeep Wagoneer
- 1968-1971 Jeep Gladiator
- 1971-1973 Buick Centurion
- 1971-1980 Buick Electra
- 1971-1980 Buick LeSabre
- 1973-1975 Buick Apollo
- 1973-1977 Buick Century
- 1973-1977 Buick Regal
- 1975 Pontiac Ventura
- 1975-1979 Buick Skylark
- 1977-1980 Buick Estate
- 1977-1978 Buick Riviera

== Big-block ==
Buick introduced its "big block" V8 in 1967 to replace the largest displacement Nailheads, which had grown to 425 cu in (6,965 cc). It retained the 4.75 in (120.7 mm) cylinder bore spacing and was produced in three displacements: 400, 430, and 455 cubic inches. Production continued through 1976.

=== 400 ===
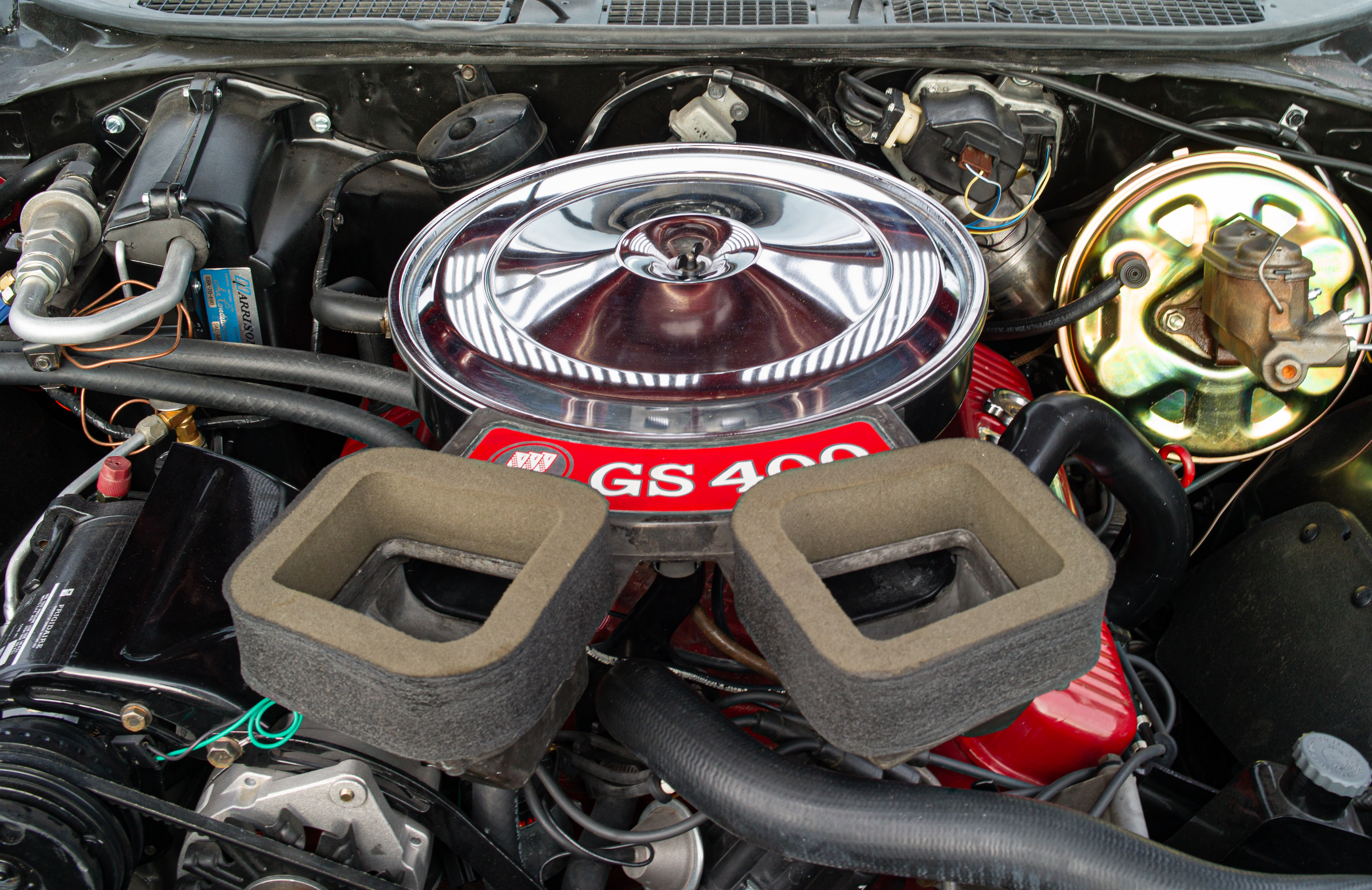
1969 Buick Gran Sport 400 Engine

The 399.95 cu in (6,554 cc) big-block V8 was produced from 1967-1969. This engine has a bore and a stroke of 4.04 in × 3.9 in (102.6 mm × 99.1 mm). It was the only large V8 engine available for the intermediate-sized GM A platform Buicks due to GM's 400 cubic inch displacement limit on mid-size cars in effect through 1970. Most parts except the pistons interchange with the 430 and 455. This 400 engine had the distributor towards the front of the engine, as opposed to the 401/400 nailhead, which had its near the firewall.

=== 430 ===
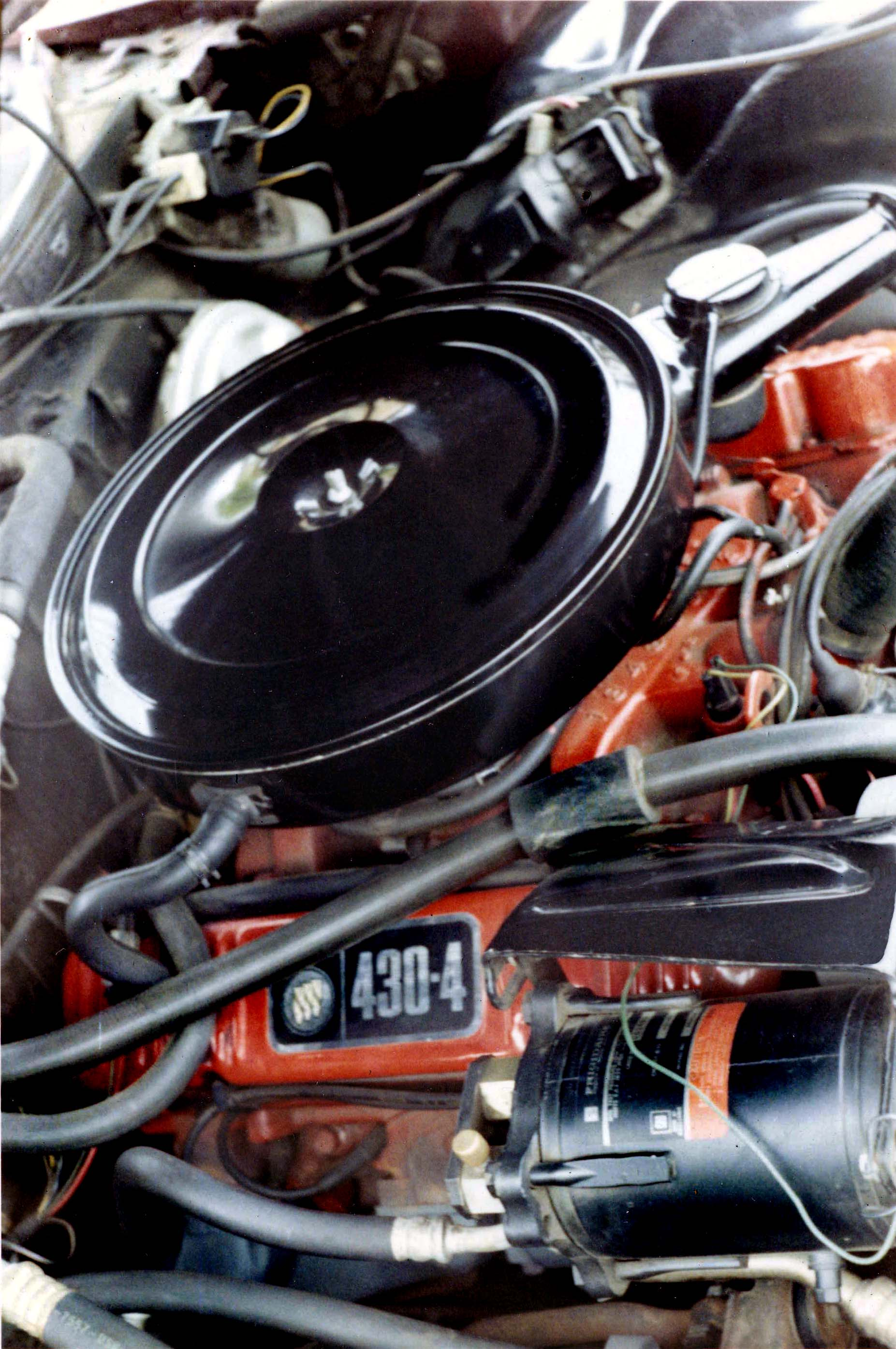
1968 Wildcat 430 CID engine

The 430-cubic-inch (7.0 L) was only produced from 1967 until 1969. This engine had a bore and a stroke of 4.1875 in × 3.9 in (106.36 mm × 99.06 mm), for an actual displacement of 429.69 cu in (7,041 cc). The 430 four-barrel engine was rated at 360 hp (268 kW) and 475 lb⋅ft (644 N⋅m) of torque. This engine was used in large B-, C- and E-body Buicks. Most parts except the pistons interchange with the 400 and 455.

Applications:

- 1967-1969 Buick Electra
- 1967-1969 Buick Riviera
- 1967-1969 Buick Wildcat

=== 455 ===
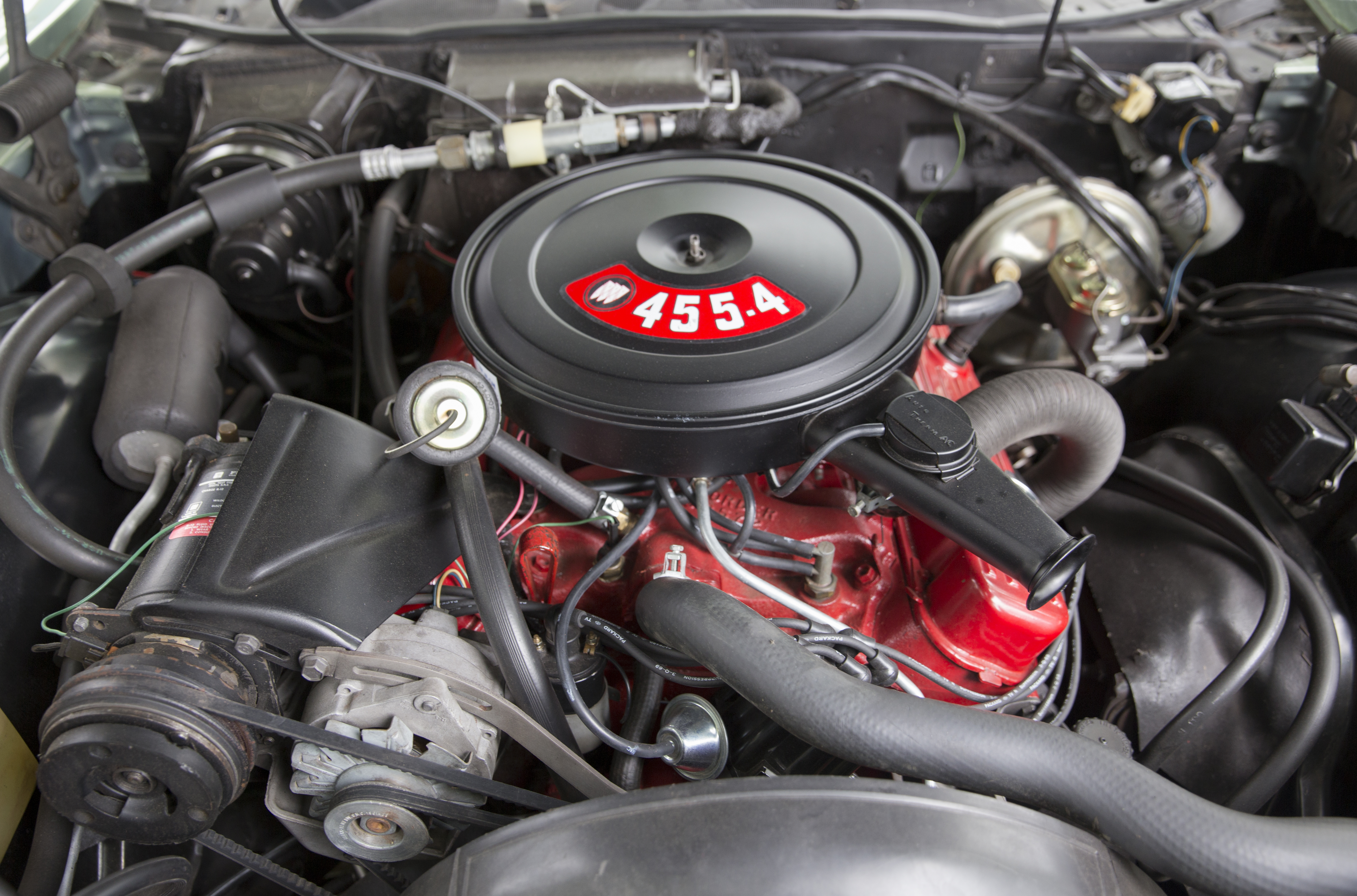
Buick 455-4 V8

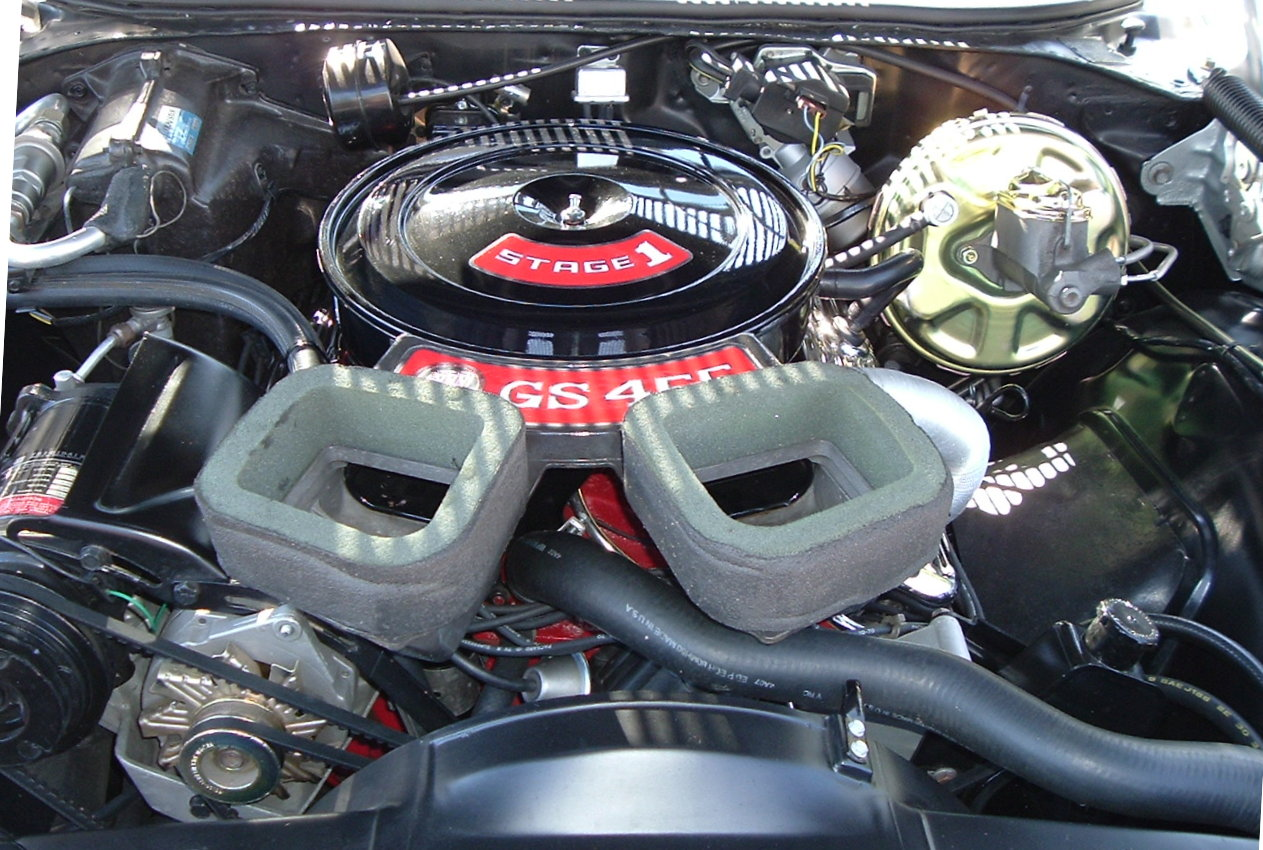
455 Stage I engine

The 400-based 455 was produced from 1970–1976, with a bore and stroke of 4.31 in × 3.9 in (109.5 mm × 99.1 mm) for an overall displacement of 455.2 cu in (7.5 L; 7,459 cc). Most parts (except pistons and heads) interchange between the 400 and the 430. The base model was rated at 350 hp (261 kW), while the 455 Stage 1 equipped with a single 4-barrel Rochester Quadrajet carburetor was rated at 360 hp (268 kW) at 4600 rpm. The regular 455 produced a rated 510 lb⋅ft (691 N⋅m) of torque at 2,800 rpm, more than any other muscle car engine. The horsepower was somewhat reduced in 1971 mainly due to the reduction in compression ratio, a change mandated by GM in response to federal laws mandating new cars use low octane gasoline in an effort to reduce exhaust emissions. Then, starting in 1972, the horsepower rating on paper would be reduced again due to a shift from SAE gross to SAE net, down to approximately 250 hp (186 kW). Unleaded gasoline and catalytic converters were required in 1975 for all US manufactured cars. Ever-tighter emissions requirements would cause the engine to drop in power still further, a little at a time, through 1976.

The 455 was one of the first "thin-wall casting" engine blocks at GM, and because of this advance in production technology, it weighs significantly less than other engines of comparable size (for example, 150 lb (68 kg) less than a Chevrolet 454 and only 25 lb (11 kg) more than a Chevrolet 350).

Applications:

Applications:

- 1970-1976 Buick Electra
- 1970-1976 Buick Estate
- 1970-1976 Buick LeSabre
- 1970-1976 Buick Riviera
- 1970-1972 Buick Skylark
- 1970 Buick Wildcat
- 1971-1973 Buick Centurion
- 1973-1974 Buick Century
- 1973-1974 Buick Gran Sport
- 1973-1974 Buick Regal

== Other GM V8s used in Buicks ==
In the mid-1970s, Buick's 455 big block became unable to meet fuel economy/emission requirements and was phased out, with the Buick 350 remaining as a factory option until 1980. In their place a variety of other GM divisions' V8s were offered, both as standard equipment and factory options. These included:

=== Oldsmobile 260 ===
The 260 cu in (4.3 L) was an Oldsmobile V8 engine shared with Buick:

- 1975–1977 Buick Skylark

=== Pontiac 301 ===
The 301 cu in (4.9 L) was a Pontiac V8 engine shared with Buick.

=== Chevrolet 305 ===
The 305 cu in (5.0 L) was a Chevrolet V8 engine shared with Buick:

- 1978–1987 Buick Regal
- 1975–1979 Buick Skylark

=== Oldsmobile 307 ===
The 307 cu in (5.0 L) was an Oldsmobile V8 engine shared with Buick:

- 1980–1985 Buick Lesabre
- 1980–1984 Buick Electra
- 1980–1985 Buick Riviera
- 1980–1990 Buick Estate Wagon
- 1986–1987 Buick Regal

=== Oldsmobile 403 ===
The 403 cu in (6.6 L) was an Oldsmobile V8 engine shared with Buick:

- 1977 Buick Century estate
- 1977–1979 Buick Riviera
- 1977–1979 Buick Electra
- 1977–1979 Buick Estate Wagon
- 1977–1979 Buick LeSabre

== See also ==
Buick Engine Colors
Years	Models	Color
1957-1966	All	Apple "Late Buick" Green
1963	Riviera	Silver
1966	Riviera	Red
1967-1974	All	Red
1975-1977	All	Medium Metallic Blue
1978-1982	All	Light Blue

- Buick straight-8 engine
- Buick V6 engine

From the 1950s-1970s, each GM division had its own V8 engine family. Many were shared among other divisions, but each design is most-closely associated with its own division:

- Cadillac V8 engine
- Chevrolet Small-Block engine
- Chevrolet Big-Block engine
- Oldsmobile V8 engine
- Pontiac V8 engine
- Holden V8 engine

GM later standardized on the later generations of the Chevrolet design:

- GM LT engine — Generation II small-block
- GM LS engine — Generation III/IV small-block
- List of GM engines
