= Chevrolet K5 Blazer =

American sport utility vehicle

Chevrolet K5 Blazer GMC Jimmy
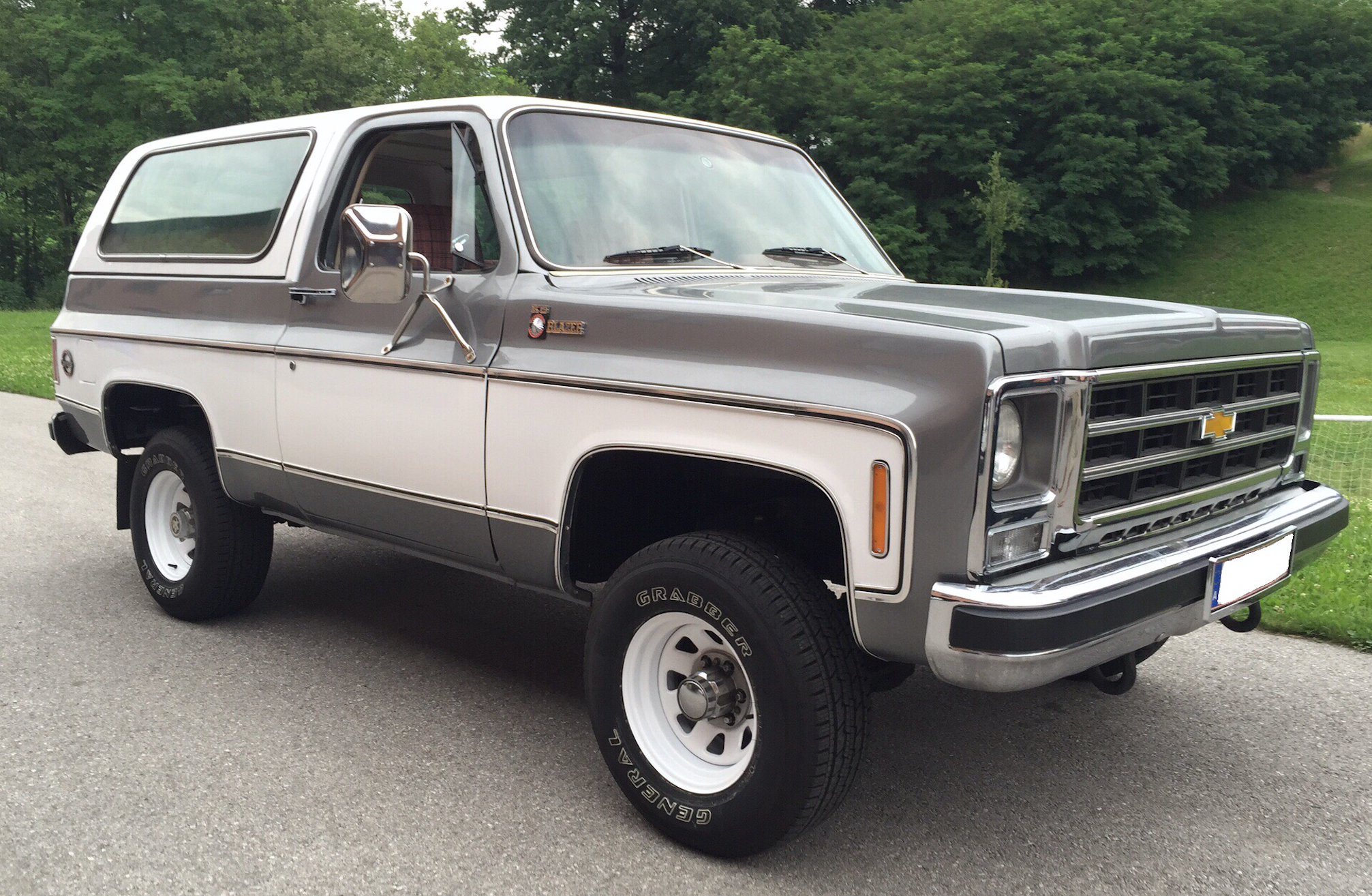
- 1979 Chevrolet K5 Blazer Cheyenne

Overview
- Manufacturer: General Motors
- Model years: 1969–1994
- Assembly: Flint, Michigan, Janesville, Wisconsin

Body and chassis
- Class: Full-size SUV
- Body style: 2-door SUV
- Layout: Front engine, rear-wheel drive (1970–1982) / four-wheel drive
- Chassis: Body-on-frame
- Related: Chevrolet Suburban; Chevrolet C/K

Chronology
- Successor: Chevrolet Tahoe/GMC Yukon

The Chevrolet K5 Blazer is a full-size sport-utility vehicle (SUV) that was marketed by Chevrolet from the 1969 to 1994 model years. A variant of the C/K truck line, the K5 Blazer is a shortened version of the half-ton pickup line. For its first two generations, the model line was a half-cab pickup truck fitted with a removable rear top (effectively making it a three-door station wagon); the final generation was fitted with permanent rear bodywork. Initially offered solely as a 4x4, the K5 Blazer was also marketed with a rear-wheel drive configuration.

Alongside the longer-wheelbase Chevrolet/GMC Suburban wagon-style SUV (offered with three rows of seating and second-row doors), the K5 Blazer was marketed by GMC from 1970 to 1991 as the GMC Jimmy (reflecting a shorthand nickname for the brand). Though the K5 prefix was used on Chevrolet badging until 1988, General Motors never internally referred the Blazer/Jimmy as such. Following the 1983 release of the S-Series Blazer/Jimmy, to avoid market confusion, GM officially changed the model lines to "Chevrolet Full-Size Blazer" and "GMC K-Jimmy" (after 1986, V-Jimmy), though they are often unofficially still addressed as "K5" to avoid confusion.

For 1992, GM redesigned its entire full-size SUV lineup, with GMC renaming the Jimmy as the GMC Yukon. The full-size Blazer was replaced for 1995, as the Chevrolet Tahoe inaugurated a shorter-wheelbase variant of the Suburban. Currently, GM markets the Tahoe and Yukon alongside the Cadillac Escalade, and later resurrected the "Blazer" name for a midsize crossover SUV, while Kia now uses the "K5" name for an unrelated midsize sedan.

== History ==
Chevrolet developed the first-generation K5 Blazer to market its own recreational off-road vehicle, competing against the International Scout and the Ford Bronco. While competing against the Jeep CJ-5, the design was also developed to improve its on-road capabilities against all of its competitors. The half-ton K10 pickup truck served as a basis, as designers shortened its wheelbase from 115 inches to 104 inches.

Though larger than both the Bronco and the Scout (and far larger than the Jeep), the use of the C/K platform for the "K5" Blazer led to multiple design breakthroughs that proved popular. Coinciding with its larger exterior size, the Blazer also had more cargo space, and better on-road handling (stemming from its wider-set wheels and longer wheelbase). Additionally, the Blazer shared a large degree of commonality with standard C/K pickup trucks, allowing for lower production costs (and price).

While base-trim K5 Blazers were intended as spartan vehicles (with both a top and passenger seat considered options), the commonality with the C/K allowed for the addition of optional "luxury" features, including automatic transmissions, radios, and air conditioning. In line with its competitors, the Blazer was built as an open-roof vehicle, with buyers selecting a choice of either a convertible soft top or a wagon-style removable hard top.

By 1970, the Blazer would overtake its rivals in the marketplace. For 1974, Chrysler introduced the Dodge Ramcharger (a shortened Dodge D100 pickup truck) and Jeep introduced the Jeep Cherokee (a shortened Jeep Gladiator, alongside the Jeep Wagoneer). For 1978, Ford introduced a second-generation Bronco to compete directly against the K5 Blazer, moving it to a shortened F-100 platform.

== First generation (Action Line; 1969–1972) ==
First generation
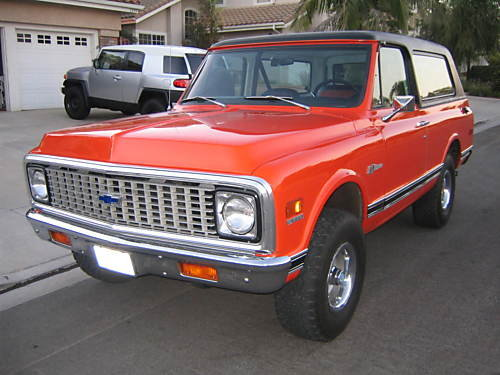
- 1972 Chevrolet K5 Blazer

Overview
- Also called: GMC Jimmy
- Model years: 1969–1972
- Assembly: Flint Truck Assembly, Flint, Michigan; St. Louis Truck Assembly, St. Louis, Missouri

Body and chassis
- Related: Chevrolet C/K (second generation)

Powertrain
- Engine: 250 cu in (4.1 L) I6; 292 cu in (4.8 L) I6; 307 cu in (5.0 L) V8; 350 cu in (5.7 L) V8
- Transmission: 3-speed TH-350 automatic; 3-speed manual; 4-speed SM465 manual

Dimensions
- Wheelbase: 104 in (2,642 mm)
- Length: 177.5 in (4,508 mm); 180 in (4,572 mm) (1971)
- Width: 79 in (2,007 mm)
- Curb weight: 3,875 lb (1,760 kg)

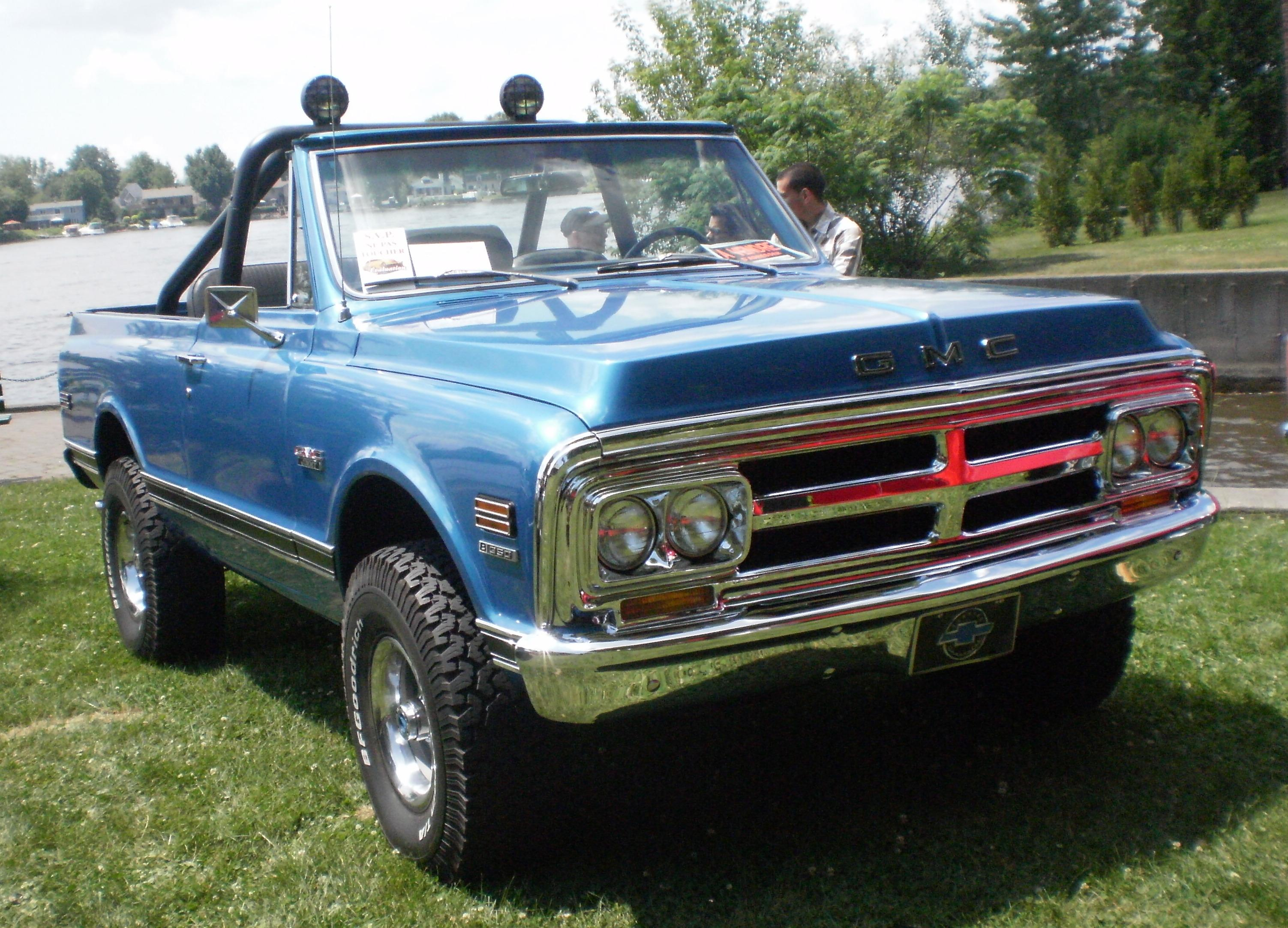
1970 GMC Jimmy without top

For its first model year (1969), the K5 Blazer was available with part-time four-wheel drive only. As an option, a removable hardtop or a soft convertible-top could be specified; passenger seats also were optional on the base model. For 1970, a rear-wheel drive model was added, and the truck was also rebadged as the GMC Jimmy.

Production Totals
Year	Production
1969	4,935
1970	11,527
1971	17,220
1972	44,266

=== Mechanical ===
There were four choices for power plants, matching the contemporaneous pickup truck options: the 250 straight-6, the 292 straight-6, the 307 V8, and the 350 V8.

There was also a choice between a three-speed automatic transmission, the Turbo-Hydramatic TH350, or one of two fully-synchronized manual transmissions: a three-speed, or a four-speed (SM465), which included a "granny gear" low-ratio 6.55:1 first gear. The 350 was offered only with the SM465 or TH350; manual locking front hubs were optional.

The four-wheel drive version had a solid front axle and used leaf springs front and rear. The two-wheel drive version came with independent front suspension and rear trailing arms, both with coil springs. Both versions used drum brakes on all four wheels until 1971, when the entire GM light truck line was fitted with front discs as standard equipment. A tachometer was optional. Two transfer cases were offered: the Dana 20, available only with the manual transmissions, or the NP-205, available with both types of transmissions. The Blazer had 8 inches (200 mm) of ground clearance and an approach angle of 35°.

Engines

- 250 cu in (4.1 L) High Torque I6 (1969–1984)
- 292 cu in (4.8 L) High Torque I6 (1970–1971)
- 307 cu in (5.0 L) Small-Block V8 (1969–1973)
- 350 cu in (5.7 L) Small-Block V8 (1969–1991)

Transfer cases

- NP-205 – gear-driven part-time four-wheel drive
- Dana 20 – gear-driven part-time four-wheel drive

== Second generation (Rounded Line; 1973–1991) ==
Second generation
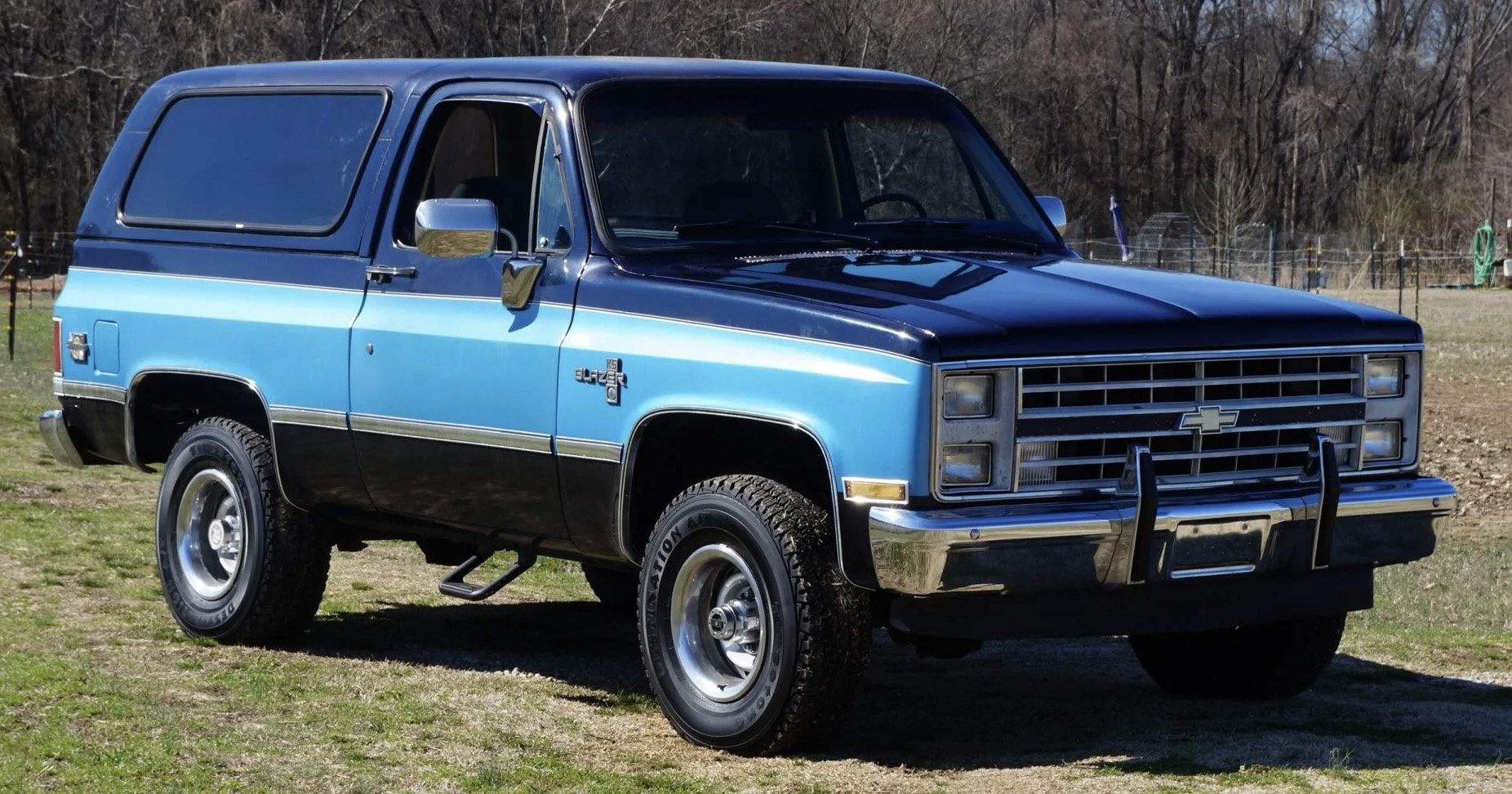
- 1985–1988 Chevrolet K5 Blazer

Overview
- Also called: Chevrolet "Full-Size" Blazer; Chevrolet K-Blazer; Chevrolet V-Blazer; GMC Jimmy; GMC K-Jimmy; GMC V-Jimmy
- Model years: 1973–1991
- Assembly: Flint Truck Assembly, Flint, Michigan; Fremont Assembly, Fremont, California

Body and chassis
- Related: Chevrolet C/K (third generation)

Powertrain
- Engine: 250 cu in (4.1 L) I6; 305 cu in (5.0 L) V8; 307 cu in (5.0 L) V8; 350 cu in (5.7 L) V8; 400 cu in (6.6 L) V8; 6.2 L Detroit Diesel V8
- Transmission: 4-speed SM465 manual; 3-speed TH-350 automatic; 3-speed TH-400 automatic; 4-speed 700-R4 automatic; 4-speed 4L80E automatic (1991)

Dimensions
- Wheelbase: 106.5 in (2,705 mm)
- Length: 184.8 in (4,694 mm)
- Width: 79.6 in (2,022 mm)
- Height: 77.8 in (1,976 mm)

=== Overview ===
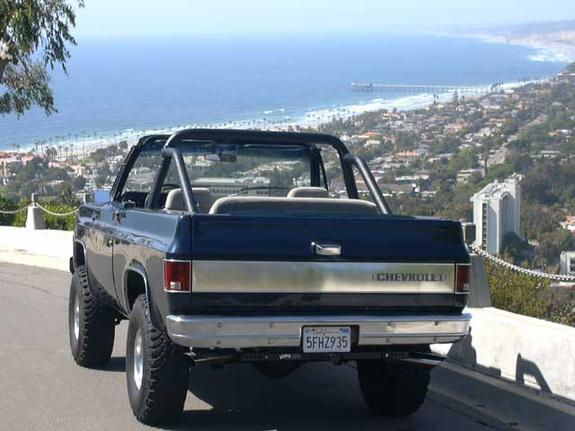
1974 K5, convertible top

For 1973, GM's line of full-size trucks was redesigned and updated; internally, GM named this the "Rounded Line" generation, while the public nickname was "square body". A tilt-steering wheel became optional. Although rear-wheel-drive Blazers were manufactured until 1982, the majority sold were four-wheel drive. As tested by Popular Science in 1973, a K5 Blazer with the 175 hp (130 kW) 350 V8, automatic transmission, and full-time four-wheel-drive accelerated from 0–60 mph (97 km/h) in 22.5 seconds, with an observed fuel economy of 9.648 mpg_{‑US} (24.38 L/100 km; 11.587 mpg_{‑imp}) at a steady 45 mph (72 km/h). With the standard 250 I6 and automatic transmission, a 1974 K5 Blazer returned fuel economy of 13.69 mpg_{‑US} (17.18 L/100 km; 16.44 mpg_{‑imp}) at the same speed.

The 1973–75 K5 Blazers were equipped with a removable convertible top. In 1976, a half-cab design was introduced and used until 1991.

The second-generation K5 models incorporated the rear hatch glass and tailgate into a single unit, which allowed the glass panel to retract inside of the tailgate by use of a manual crank mounted on the tailgate or an electric motor activated by a key-operated switch on the tailgate and a dash-mounted switch. The weight of the large glass panel was rumored to be a liability as the manual crank gears wore prematurely and the electric motor was prone to frequent overheating and subsequent failure. This also included the electric motor drive cable which goes to the window regulator to the motor (similar in design to a speedometer cable), which usually would fail under heavy abuse. Another feature of the K5 Blazer tailgate was the safety switch connected to the electric motor which prevented the rear window from being raised if the tailgate was unlatched.

The smaller S-10 Blazer, based on the compact S-10 pickups, debuted in 1983; General Motors began officially addressing the larger models as "Chevrolet Full-Size Blazer" and "GMC K-Jimmy."

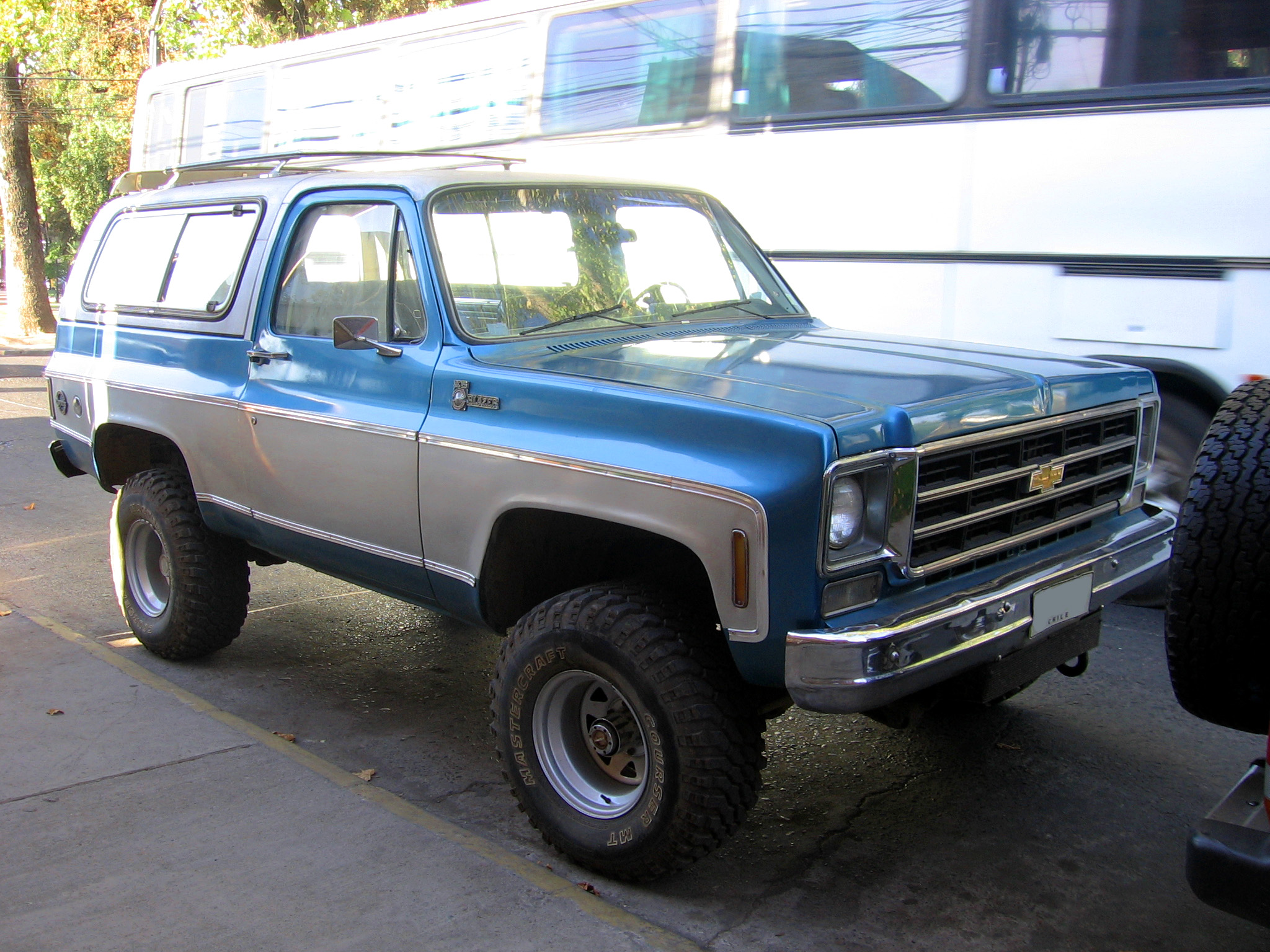
1977 (Cheyenne)

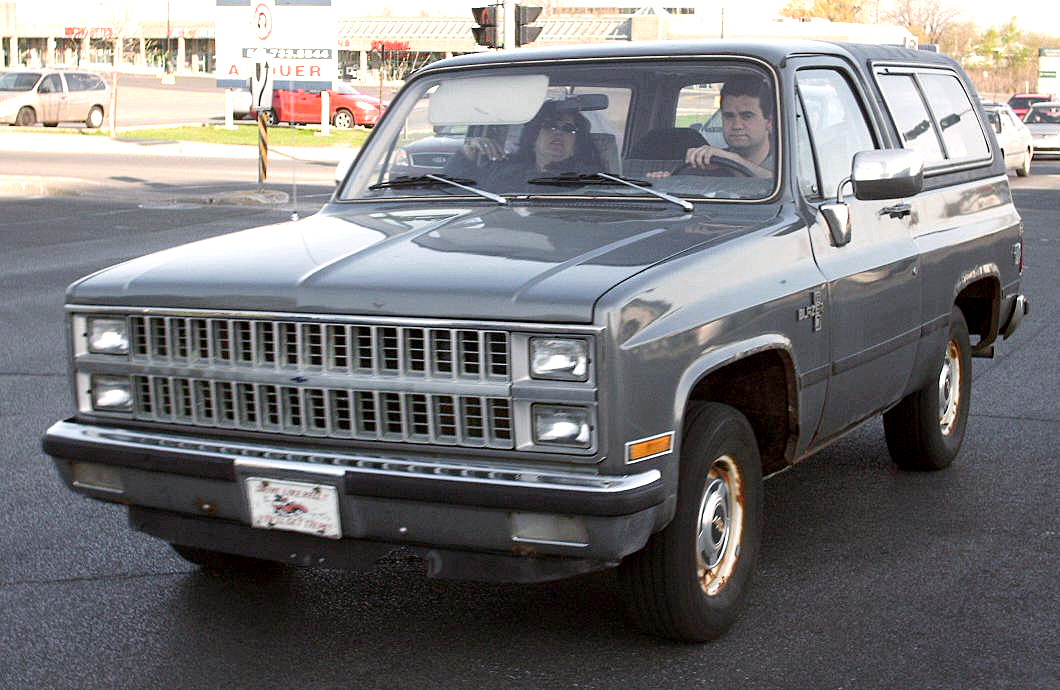
1981–1982

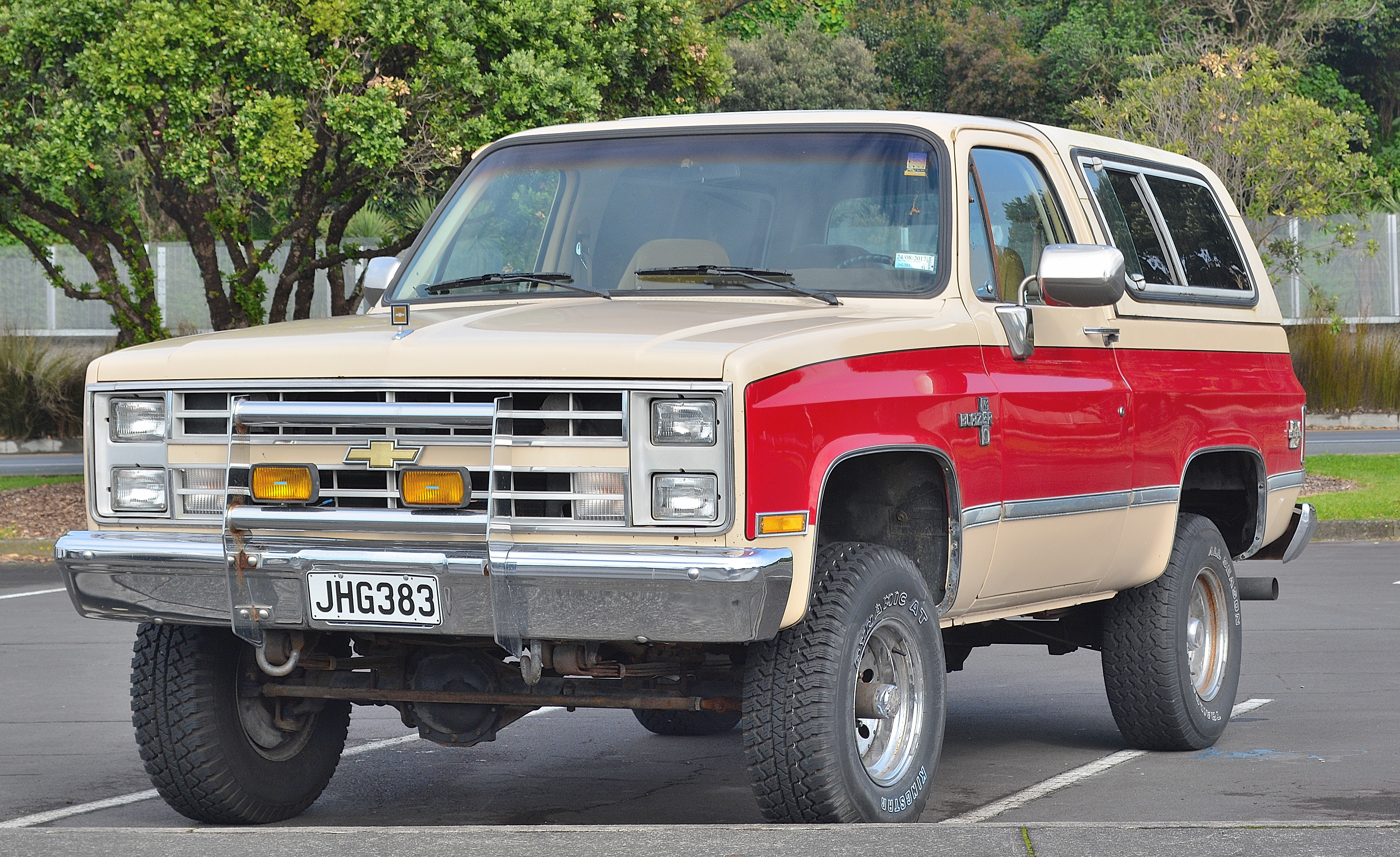
1985–1988

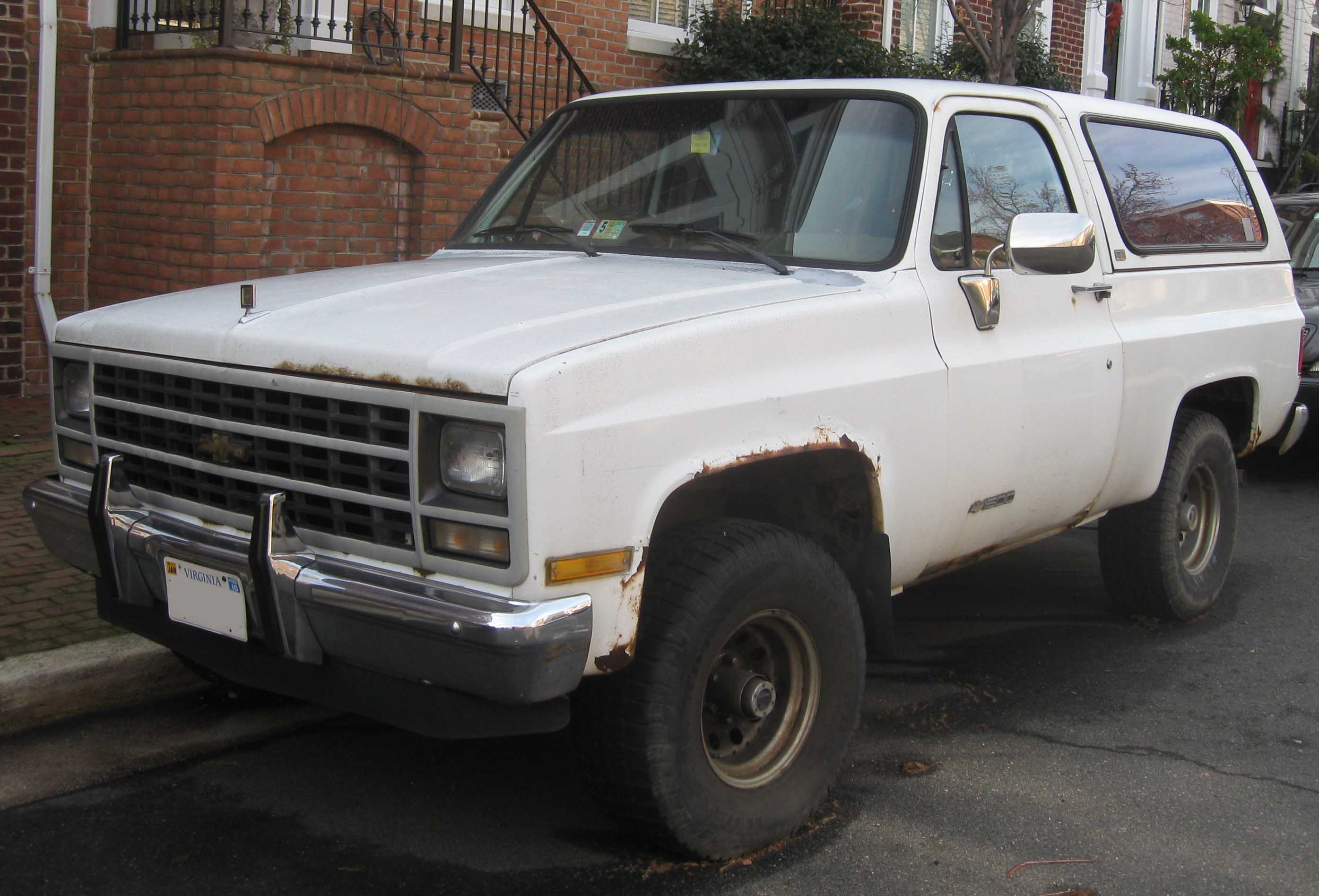
1989–1991 (Scottsdale)

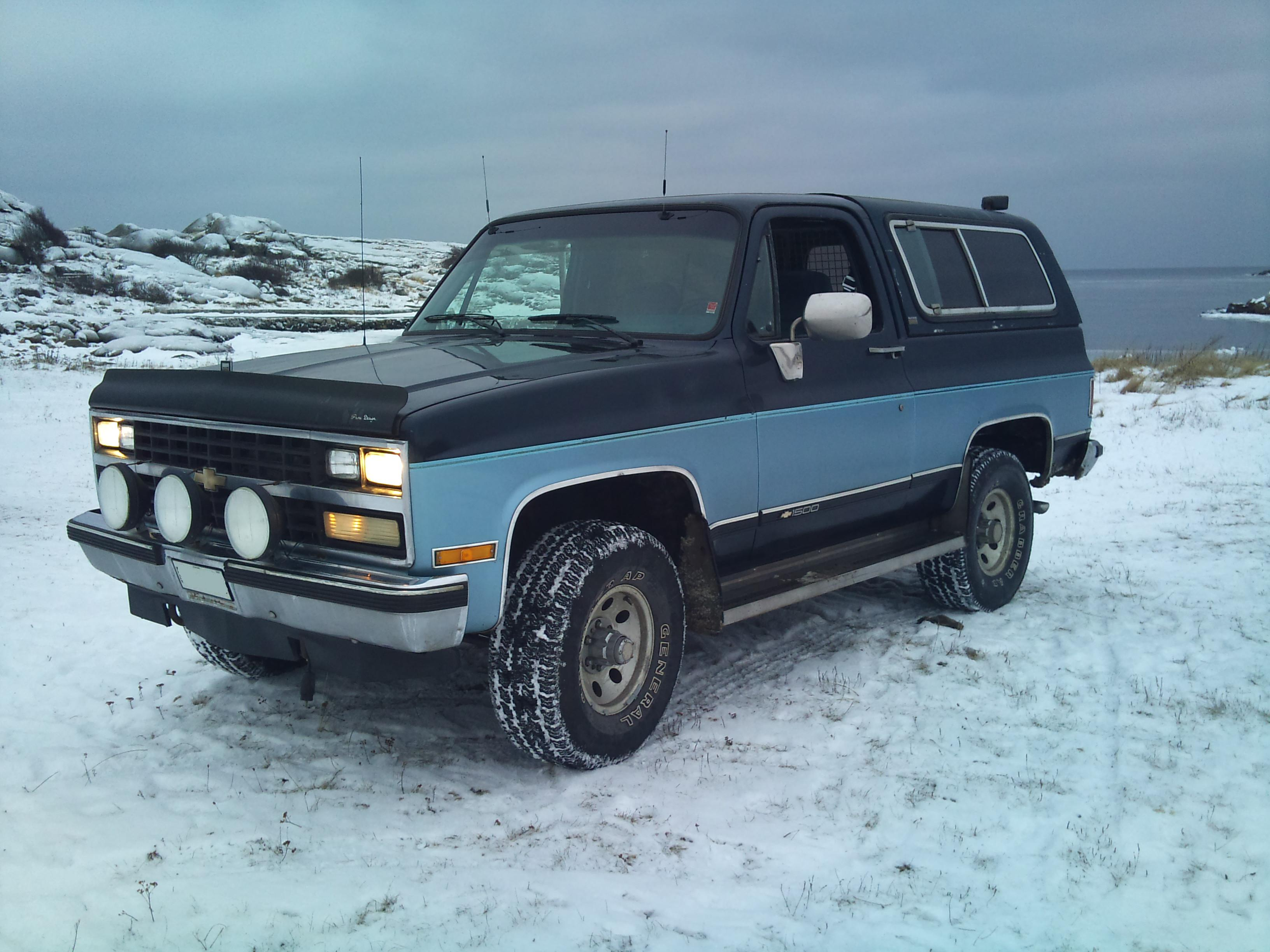
1990 V1500 Silverado 6.2 Diesel

=== Model changes ===
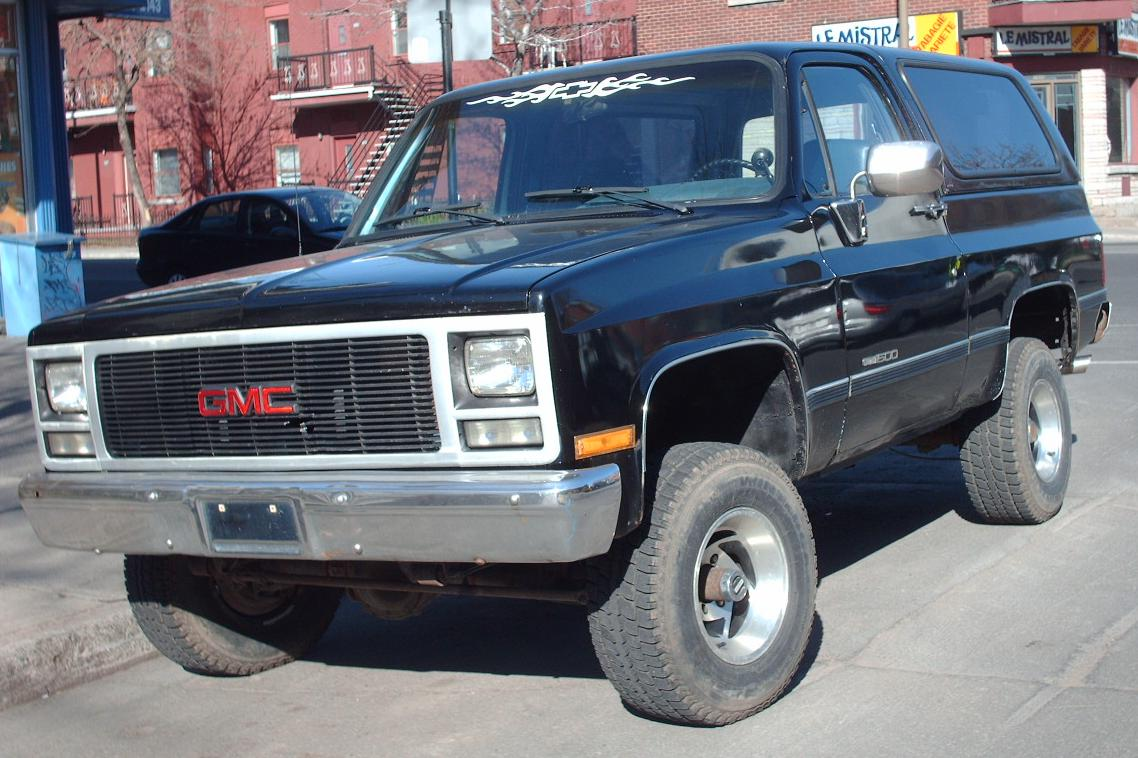
A 1990–1991 V-Jimmy (From 1987 to 1991, "K-Jimmy" was replaced by "V-Jimmy")

Compared to the first generation K5 Blazer, the Rounded Line K5 grew by 7 in (180 mm) overall, on a 2.5 in (64 mm) longer wheelbase. The styling was refreshed in 1981, mirroring the changes introduced on the 1981 C/K pickups, most visible in the front end with available stacked dual square headlamps and reduced weight.

GM temporarily changed the usual "C/K" designation to "R" and "V" for the 1987 through 1991 model years. This was done to avoid confusion with the GMT400-based Chevrolet C/K pickup trucks, which were introduced in 1988, during the overlap period. Although the GMT400 trucks were introduced in the spring of 1987 as a 1988 model, the K5 Blazer, Suburban, and crew-cab trucks retained the earlier platform until 1991.

Production totals
Year	Production
1973	44,841
1974	56,798
1975	50,548
1976	74,389
1977	86,838
1978	88,858
1979	90,987
1980	31,776
1981	23,635
1982	24,514
1983	26,245
1984	39,329
1985	40,011
1986	37,310
1987	32,437
1988	28,446
1989	26,663
1990	18,921
1991	7,332

In 1988, four new colors were introduced: Bright Blue Metallic, Forest Green Metallic, Light Mesa Brown Metallic, and Dark Mesa Brown Metallic. More new features for 1988 included a fixed mast antenna in place of the old windshield antenna, a trip odometer as part of the gauge package cluster, and an improved pulse windshield wiper control. Also, helping to reduce air leaks in the doors was a new door handle seal. Also in 1988, General Motors eliminated the "K5" emblems.

In late 1988 for the 1989 model year, the front grille was changed to resemble the squared-off ones used on the GMT400 series of pickups. The 1989 Blazer had new base and up-level grilles, as well as new headlight bezels, body side moldings, and front bumper rub strips. New for 1989 was the introduction of an all-new base coat/clear coat paint.

For the 1990 model year, all Blazers now had a standard rear-wheel anti-lock braking system. A new electronic speedometer system, with a six-digit odometer on the dashboard, was also introduced for 1990, along with non-asbestos brake linings. A new brake warning light on the dashboard was also introduced for 1990. The Blazer body also used double-sided, galvanized exterior sheet metal. A new option for 1990 was power mirrors. Three-point shoulder harness also become standard for rear passengers. The rear seat armrest were eliminated from rear seat to make room for shoulder belts and pads were added to the wheel housings.

For 1991, two new exterior colors, Brilliant Blue and Slate Metallic were offered.

=== Drivetrain ===
The K5 Blazer was fitted with a 250 cu in (4.1 L) inline-six as standard through 1982. Available engines included small-block V8s of 305, 307, 350, or 400 cubic inches (5.0, 5.0, 5.7, and 6.6 liters), and a 6.2 L Detroit Diesel V8. The six-cylinder Blazer was not recommended for towing.

Since 1981 (in the wake of the 1973 Arab Oil Embargo and the 1979 energy crisis), Chevrolet and GMC used the smaller displacement 305s with a 9.2:1 compression ratio. These engines produced nearly as much torque as the 350, giving a similar driving feel. However, these power plants were underpowered and prone to detonation (engine knocking), especially with the electronic spark control module. To achieve the 9.2:1 compression ratio, the cylinder head chambers were smaller, measuring 56 cc instead of 76 cc. After 1987, when throttle-body injection was introduced in the truck engines, the 350 was made the standard power plant.

Corporate 10-bolt axles were upgraded to 30-spline axle shafts from previous 28-spline shafts in 1989. In addition, the standard L05 5.7-liter V8 now had one serpentine accessory drive belt in place of the older multi-belt accessory drive setup. 1989 was the first year for the NP241 transfer case and also the only year for speedometer-cable driven version of the NP241. The 5.7 liter V8 (L05) engine was improved for 1990 with the addition of improved oil control rings, a redesigned rear crankshaft seal, a new camshaft sprocket design, non-asbestos intake manifold gaskets, and heavy-duty intake valves. For 1991, the 700R4 was renamed to the 4L60. The TBI (throttle body injection) system used on the Blazer's standard 5.7-liter V8 had longer throttle shaft bearings, new throttle return springs, and improved fuel mixture distribution. The 5.7 liter V8 also had new heavy-duty intake valves and powdered metal camshaft sprockets. Standard on all engines was a lighter more powerful 100-amp CS130 alternator.

K5 Blazer engines (1973–1991)
Engine	Years	Power	Torque	Notes
250 cu in (4.1 L) I6	1973–1978	105 hp (78 kW)	185 lb⋅ft (251 N⋅m)	
250 cu in (4.1 L) I6	1979–1982	130 hp (97 kW)	210 lb⋅ft (285 N⋅m)	
305 cu in (5.0 L) V8	1981–1986	160 hp (119 kW)	235 lb⋅ft (319 N⋅m)	Federal emissions
305 cu in (5.0 L) V8	1981–1986	155 hp (116 kW)	240 lb⋅ft (325 N⋅m)	California emissions
305 cu in (5.0 L) V8	1977–1982	130 hp (97 kW)	240 lb⋅ft (325 N⋅m)	2-barrel carburetor
305 cu in (5.0 L) V8	1987	170 hp (127 kW)	260 lb⋅ft (353 N⋅m)	Throttle-body injection
307 cu in (5.0 L) V8	1973	115 hp (86 kW)	205 lb⋅ft (278 N⋅m)	Federal emissions
350 cu in (5.7 L) V8	1973–1986	160 hp (119 kW)	275 lb⋅ft (373 N⋅m)	
350 cu in (5.7 L) V8	1987–1991	210 hp (157 kW)	300 lb⋅ft (407 N⋅m)	Throttle-body injection
400 cu in (6.6 L) V8	1975–1979	185 hp (138 kW)	300 lb⋅ft (407 N⋅m)	4WD models only
379 cu in (6.2 L) Detroit Diesel V8	1982–1991	135 hp (101 kW)	240 lb⋅ft (325 N⋅m)	4WD models only

1973–1980 Blazers used the gear-driven part-time NP-205 transfer case (mostly mated to the SM465 manual transmission and some TH350s) or the chain-driven full-time NP-203 transfer case (mated to the TH350 automatic) and Dana 44 front/12-bolt rear axle combination through 1980. Starting in 1981 used the chain-driven NP208 transfer case (NP241 after 1988) with front 10-bolt/rear 10-bolt axle combinations until 1991. There is an overlap of 12-bolt rears into the early 1980s, while the 10-bolt front axle was phased into production in the late 1970s.

K5 Blazer transfer cases & axles
197x							198x										199x		(P)art / (F)ull-time
73	74	75	76	77	78	79	80	81	82	83	84	85	86	87	88	89	90	91	(P)art / (F)ull-time
Transfer cases
Dana 20 (Note: Gear-driven)																			P
NP-203 (Note: Chain-driven)																			F
NP-205								NP-208 (Note: Shift on-the-fly)								NP-241			P
Axles																			(F)ront / (R)ear
Dana 44																			F
				GM Corporate 10-bolt															F
GM Corporate 12-bolt									GM Corporate 10-bolt										R

== Third-generation (GMT400; 1992–1994) ==
Third generation
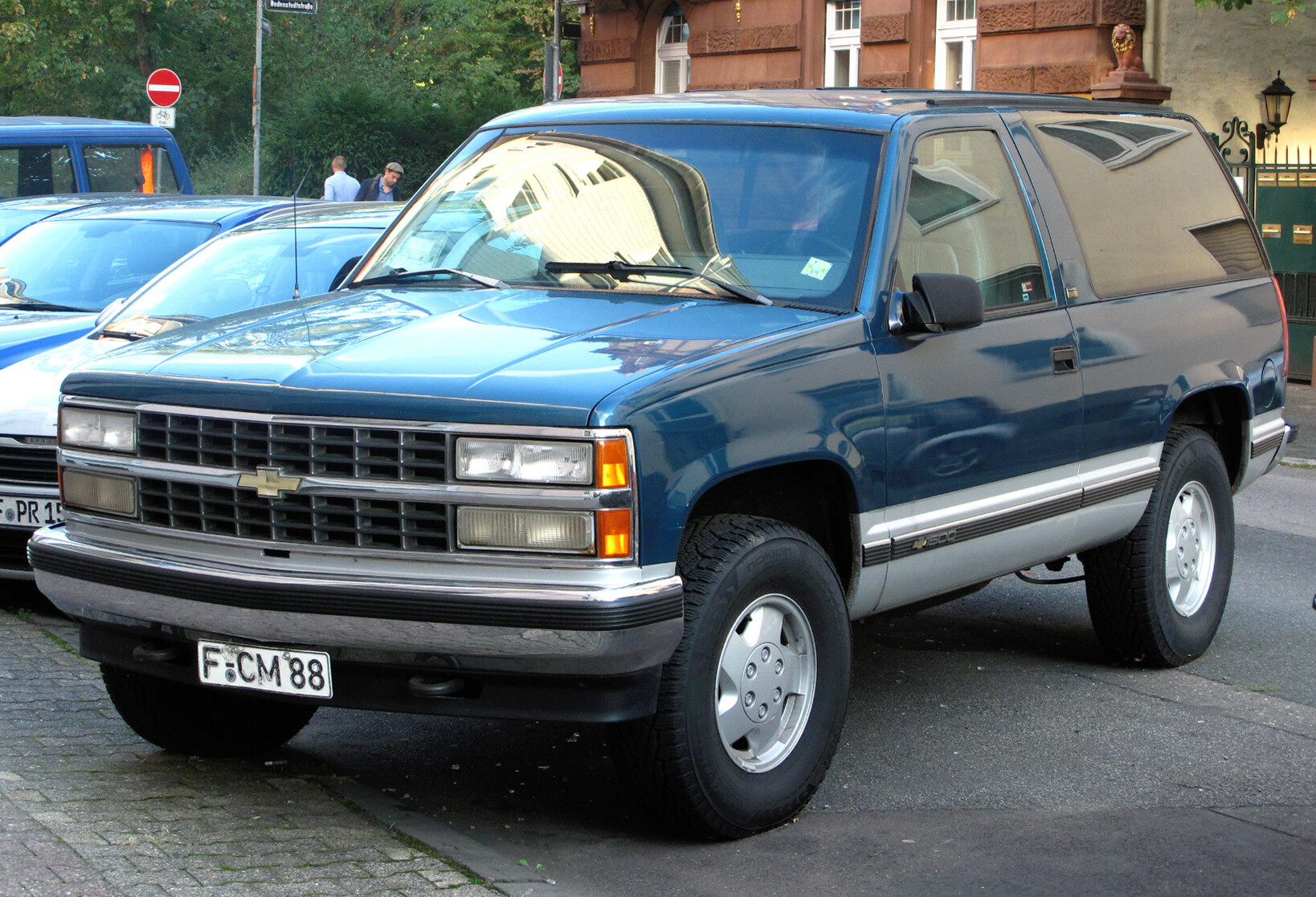
- 1992–1994 Chevrolet Full-Size Blazer

Overview
- Also called: GMC Yukon
- Production: 1991–1994
- Model years: 1992–1994
- Assembly: Janesville Assembly Plant, Janesville, Wisconsin
- Designer: Chuck Jordan

Body and chassis
- Platform: GMT415
- Related: Chevrolet C/K (fourth generation)

Powertrain
- Engine: 350 cu in (5.7 L) L05 V8; 395 cu in (6.5 L) Detroit Diesel V8
- Transmission: 4-speed 4L60 automatic; 5-speed manual

Dimensions
- Wheelbase: 111.5 in (2,832 mm)
- Length: 188 in (4,775 mm)
- Width: 77 in (1,956 mm)
- Height: 72 in (1,829 mm)
- Curb weight: 4,500 lb (2,000 kg)

Chronology
- Successor: Chevrolet Tahoe

For the 1992 model year, the third-generation Blazer made its debut, as GM moved its full-size SUVs to the GMT400 architecture (four years after its C/K debut). Chevrolet dropped the K5 prefix completely, with the "Full-Size Blazer" retained from the R/V-series. The model line grew modestly in size (3 inches in length, 6 inches in wheelbase), but underwent significant changes to its configuration. In place of the long-running half-cab pickup, the Blazer was now a three-door wagon, sharing its bodywork aft of the doors with the Suburban (losing both its removable roof and retractable tailgate glass). In a branding change, GMC dropped the Jimmy name from its counterpart for 1992 (giving the name to its midsize SUV), renaming it as the GMC Yukon.

The Blazer was named "Four Wheeler of the Year" in 1992 by Four Wheeler magazine. For 1993, the model line took part in further branding changes. The GMT400 Blazer dropped its "Full-Size" prefix, becoming the Chevrolet Blazer, as the GMT330 S10 Blazer was renamed the "S-Blazer".

For 1992, a 210 horsepower (157 kW) 350 cu in (5.7 L) small-block V8 with throttle-body fuel injection was the only engine offered with the Blazer/Yukon (the 6.2L diesel V8 was discontinued as an option). For 1994, a 180 horsepower (134 kW) 6.5 L Detroit Diesel turbodiesel V8 was introduced as an option; the 6.5 L engine was offered only with an automatic transmission. All versions were fitted with an independent front suspension and solid rear axle with leaf springs; four-wheel-drive versions had torsion bars on the front, while two-wheel-drive versions had coil springs.

=== 1995 name change ===
For 1995, Chevrolet followed suit with GMC, renaming the GMT400 Chevrolet Blazer as the Chevrolet Tahoe (with the midsize S-Blazer adopting the Blazer nameplate). Serving as the counterpart of the GMC Yukon, the 1995 Tahoe continued to be offered as a three-door counterpart of the Suburban. The same year, GM offered a third variant of the GMT400 SUVs, with an all-new five-door Tahoe/Yukon, sized between the two traditional configurations (with a two-row interior).

After 1997, GMC discontinued the three-door Yukon, with Chevrolet discontinuing the three-door Tahoe after 1999; as of current production, GM has not since produced a three-door full-size SUV.

For 1998 and 1999, respectively, the five-door Tahoe served as the basis for the GMC Yukon Denali and the Cadillac Escalade, the first full-size luxury SUVs produced by GM.

== Variants and special models ==
=== M1009 ===
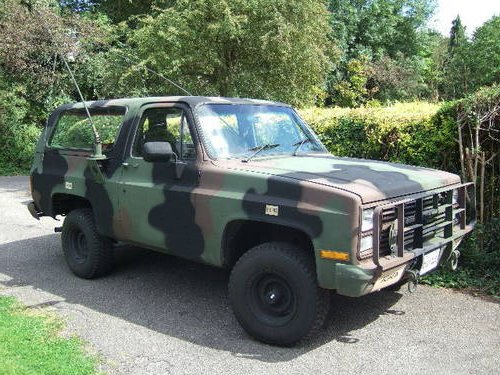
Military M1009 CUCV K5 Blazer

Around 1976, a prototype K5 Blazer was used as a testbed for a military CUCV vehicle built by Vic Hickey, father of the HUMVEE. Between 1983 and 1987, what is known as the M1009 CUCV was the production militarized version of the civilian K5. The differences are the lack of an air conditioner, an additional leaf spring in the suspension, a hybrid 12/24 V electrical system (described in detail below), blackout headlights, front mounted brush guard, a rifle rack, and special paint jobs. A majority of them are painted olive drab green or in the woodland camouflage pattern, though some vehicles that saw desert use were painted tan. All M1009s, including its derivatives, are powered with the 6.2 L Diesel power plant.

The M1009s have a split 24/12 V electrical system. Most of the truck actually runs on 12 V. It has two separate 12 V alternators and batteries wired in series, with only the glow plug system, injection pump, starter, and jumper cable jack being wired to the 24 V terminals; everything else in the truck runs on 12 V. The glow plugs are actually 12 V glow plugs with a resistor pack on the firewall to drop the 24 V down to 12 V. This resistor pack can be bypassed and the glow plugs run directly off of the 12 V battery. If this is done and the 24 V starter is replaced with a standard 12 V starter, the second alternator is no longer needed (If this is done then the military 24 V slave adapter in the grille will need to be disconnected as well).

Some decommissioned M1009s end up in law enforcement use (e.g., with the Los Angeles County Sheriff's Department) or sold through government auctions, but a handful are still in use by the National Guard.

=== 1976–77 Chalet / Casa Grande ===
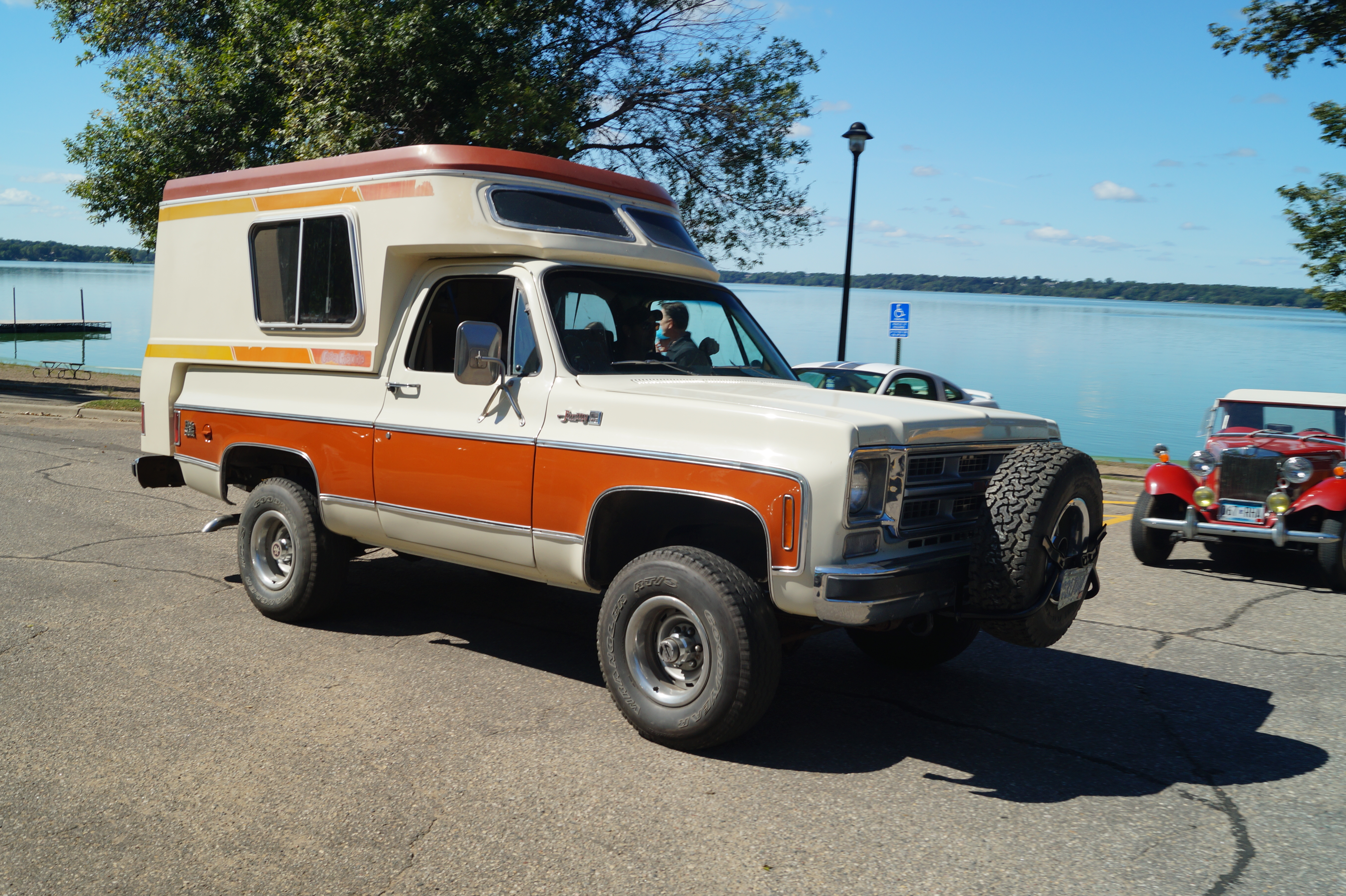
1976 GMC Jimmy Casa Grande

In 1976, GM collaborated with recreational vehicle manufacturer Chinook Mobilodge to offer modified versions of the Blazer and Jimmy with a permanently-fixed popup truck camper unit. Approximately 1,800 Blazer Chalet and Jimmy Casa Grande vehicles were built over two years of production. With the top raised, interior headroom increased from 59 to 79.5 in (1,500 to 2,020 mm). The integrated camper allows occupants to walk through from the cab to the rear living quarters. In 1977, suggested retail price of the base model was US$9,426 (equivalent to $50,000 in 2025), but options could increase the price to $13,000.

=== 1993–97 Yukon GT ===
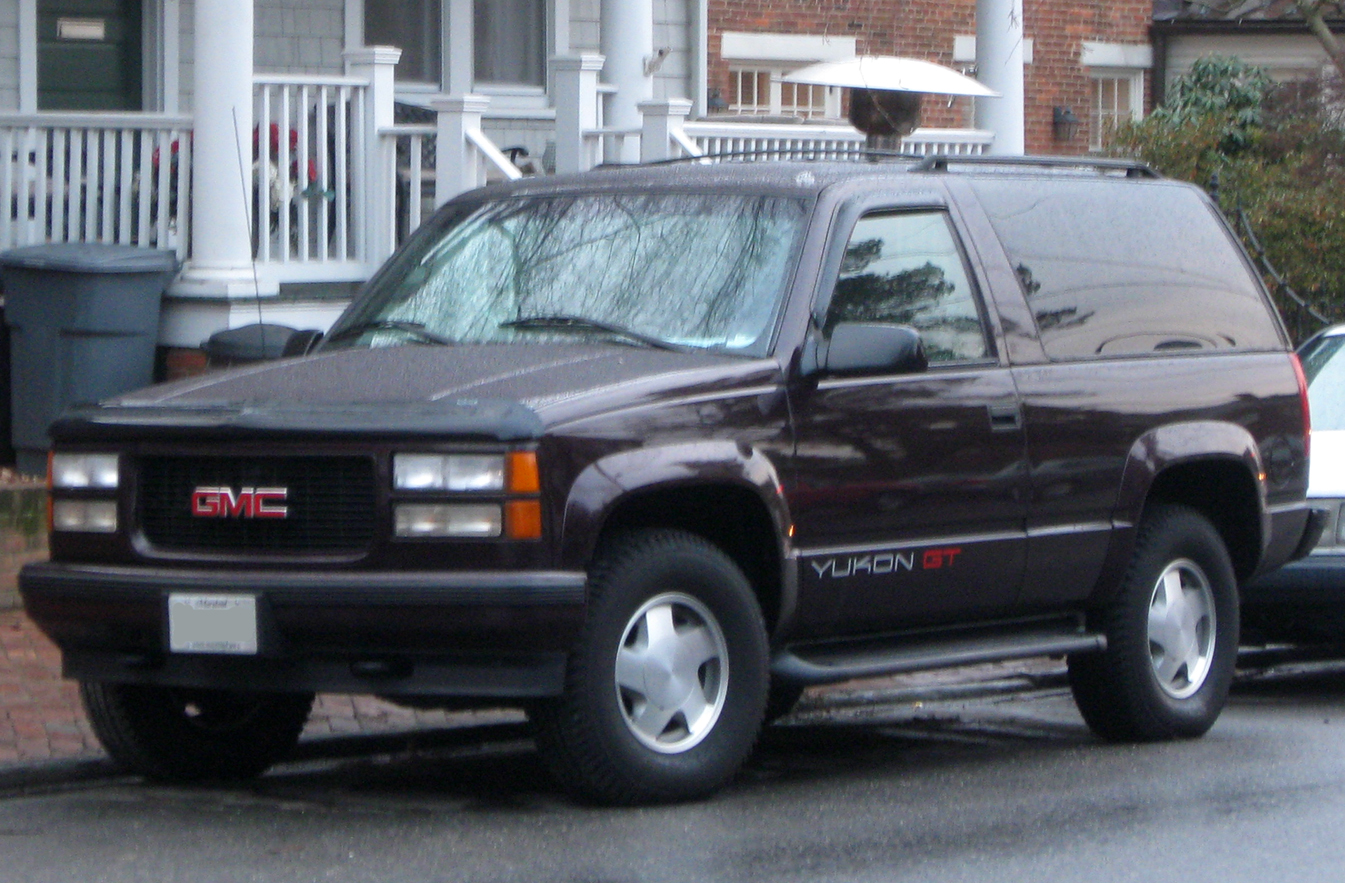
GMC Yukon GT

The Yukon GT was introduced in 1993 as a sport-appearance trim variant of the third generation GMC Yukon (previously Jimmy) as a "Sport Equipment Package", option code BYP. It is equipped with four-wheel-drive and aluminum wheels; the GT package was available exclusively with the 350 in^{3} (5.7L) L05 V8. A 5-speed manual transmission is standard, but the automatic transmission can be selected. Visually, the GT was rendered in a monochromatic color scheme by painting the grille, bumpers, trim, and fender flares the same color as the body, which was available in black or dark garnet. It matched the appearance of the contemporaneously marketed high-performance GMC Syclone truck and Typhoon SUV, but unlike the smaller vehicles, the Yukon GT did not have any special engine tuning.

=== 1977 K5 Blazer-E ===
At the 2020 SEMA show, Chevrolet Performance exhibited a electromod 1977 K5 Blazer-E equipped with the "Electric Connect and Cruise" (aka eCrate) package, which is the powertrain from the Chevrolet Bolt EV repackaged and sold commercially as a kit to convert conventionally-powered cars to electric vehicles. The K5 Blazer-E followed the Chevrolet E-10 Concept, a similar "electromod" restoration and electrification project that converted a 1962 C-10 pickup with a Bolt-derived EV powertrain, shown at SEMA 2019. Other "electromod" restorations with EV powertrains that followed the K5 Blazer-E include the 2021 Hyundai Heritage Series and 2021 Ford F-100 Eluminator.

The Blazer-E retains its original driveshafts, axles, and transfer case, and uses a more powerful 200 hp (150 kW) Bolt traction motor instead of the 400 cu.in. V8, which had an estimated output of 175 hp (130 kW) using modern ratings. The Bolt's 60 kW-hr battery pack is bolted into the cargo area of the K5 Blazer-E. Aftermarket components were used to add power steering, generate vacuum for the vintage braking system, and control the gauges, with the fuel gauge converted to indicate state of charge instead.

=== "Retro Tahoe" K5 Blazer homage ===
For the 2019 SEMA show, a customized 2018 Chevrolet Tahoe was restyled by Flat Out Autos as an homage to the first generation K5 Blazer. Dubbed the "Retro Tahoe", it was built to honor the Blazer's 50th anniversary. Steps to complete the customization include replacement of the stock exterior sheetmetal, a carbon fiber rear hatch, and machined aluminum door handles; four were built for members of the Abu Dhabi royal family. The following year, the same shop showed a modified two-door K5 Blazer homage using a sectioned Tahoe chassis.
