= Muncie SM420 transmission =

The Muncie SM420 is a heavy duty, four-speed manual transmission that was produced from 1947 to 1967 by General Motors for civilian use in a variety of pickup trucks, buses, dump trucks and heavy equipment. They were used in some military vehicles into the 1980s. It was replaced in civilian vehicles by the Muncie SM465 transmission in 1968.

== Design ==
The transmission has a 7.05:1 ratio first gear, which is one of the lowest "granny" gears ever produced in a production transmission. It weighs 135lb, which is 40 pounds less than the SM465 that replaced it. While the construction is dated by modern standards, these are sought after by off-road enthusiasts due to the ruggedness and gear ratios.

=== Gear ratio ===
- 1st - 7.05:1
- 2nd - 3.58:1
- 3rd - 1.71:1
- 4th - 1.00:1

=== Specifications ===
- Weight: 135 pounds
- Length: 10.4 inches
- Height: 17 inches
- Input shaft: 1 1/8 inch, 10-spline

== See also ==
- Muncie SM465 transmission
- New Venture Gear 4500 transmission
- List of GM transmissions
