= Buick Invicta =

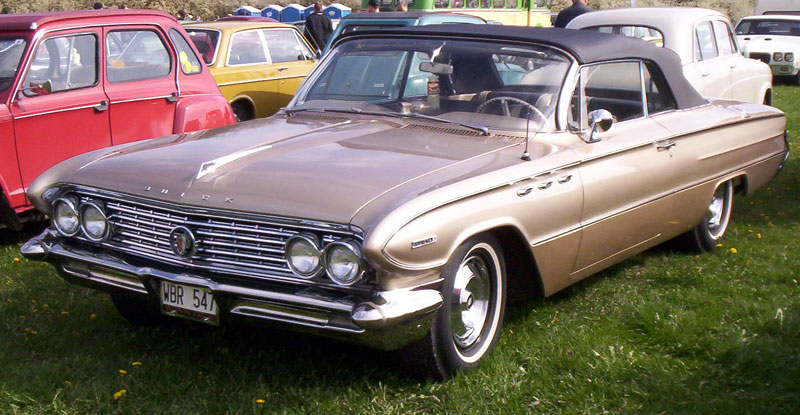
- 1961 Invicta convertible

Overview
- Manufacturer: Buick (General Motors)
- Model years: 1959–1963
- Assembly: (main plant); Flint, Michigan, USA (Buick City) (branch assembly); Arlington, Texas, USA (Arlington Assembly); Doraville, Georgia, USA (Doraville Assembly) "Atlanta"; Kansas City, Kansas, USA (Fairfax Assembly); Linden, New Jersey, USA (Linden Assembly); South Gate, California, USA (South Gate Assembly); Wilmington, Delaware, USA (Wilmington Assembly)

Body and chassis
- Class: Full-size
- Layout: Front-engine, rear-wheel-drive
- Platform: B-body
- Related: Pontiac Ventura; Oldsmobile Super 88

Chronology
- Predecessor: Buick Century
- Successor: Buick Wildcat

The Buick Invicta is a full-size automobile produced by Buick from 1959 to 1963. The Invicta was a continuation of the mid-range Buick Century that mated the standard size Buick LeSabre (pre-1959, Buick Special) body with Buick's larger 401 cubic inch Fireball V8 engine. The Invicta continued to be the intermediate hardtop coupe, hardtop sedan, convertible and station wagon, labeled as the Buick Invicta Estate, until it was replaced by the Buick Wildcat as a coupe or sedan, while the station wagon was replaced by the Buick Sport Wagon in 1965.

The name was derived from Latin and signified 'unconquerable, invincible, unbeatable, unvanquished' according to Buick Motor Division sales training materials.

== First generation (1959–1960) ==
First generation
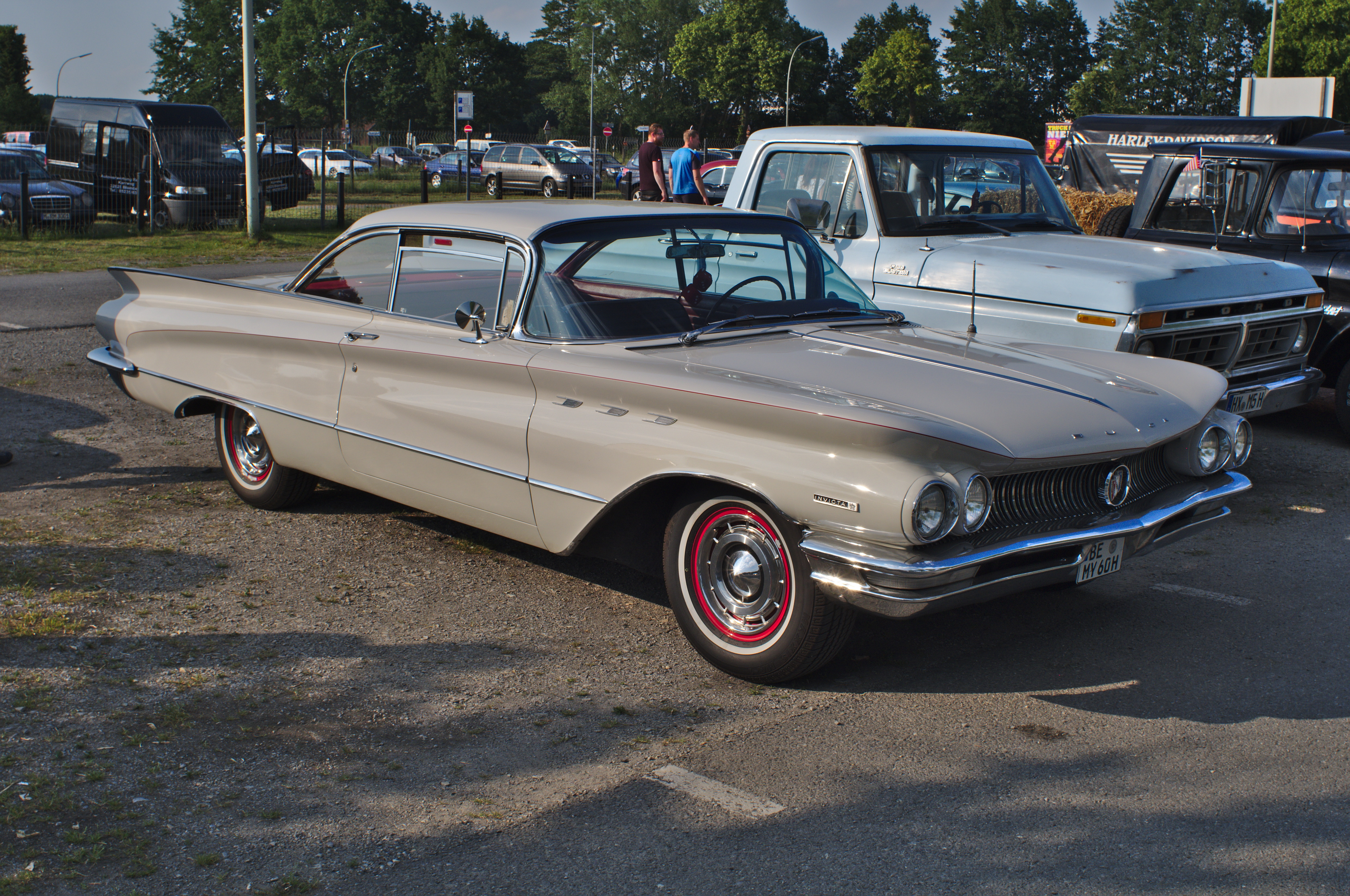
- 1960 Invicta 2-door hardtop

Overview
- Model years: 1959–1960

Body and chassis
- Body style: 2-door convertible; 2-door hardtop; 4-door hardtop; 4-door Estate station wagon

Powertrain
- Engine: 364 cu in (6.0 L) Fireball V8; 401 cu in (6.6 L) Fireball V8
- Transmission: 2-speed Twin Turbine automatic; 3-speed Triple Turbine automatic

Dimensions
- Wheelbase: 123.0 in (3,124 mm)
- Length: 217.4 in (5,522 mm) (1959); 217.9 in (5,535 mm) (1960)
- Width: 80.7 in (2,050 mm) (1959); 80.0 in (2,032 mm) (1960)
- Curb weight: 4,255–4,679 lb (1,930–2,122 kg)

The Invicta series was introduced as a full line of body styles for model year 1959. Sales never approached that of either the entry-level LeSabre or top level Electra models, but were consistent with the traditional sales penetration of Buick's sporty mid-priced models (the 1954 to 1958 Century and 1963 to 1970 Wildcat).

In a survey of 1959 Buick owners in the March, 1959 issue of Popular Mechanics, 47.1% of owners like the ride comfort, though many (25.2%) said the drive shaft tunnel was too big.

Starting in 1960, an Invicta Custom trim package was offered, featuring bucket seats and a 'consolette' in the hardtop coupe, convertible, and wagon and a leather bench seat with a center armrest on some 4 door hardtops. Sales were nominal.

According to Robin Moore's 1969 book The French Connection, "the 1960 Buick Invicta had a peculiarity in body construction conducive to the installations of...extraordinary, virtually detection-proof traps concealed within the fenders and undercarriage" that made it a popular model for international heroin smugglers.

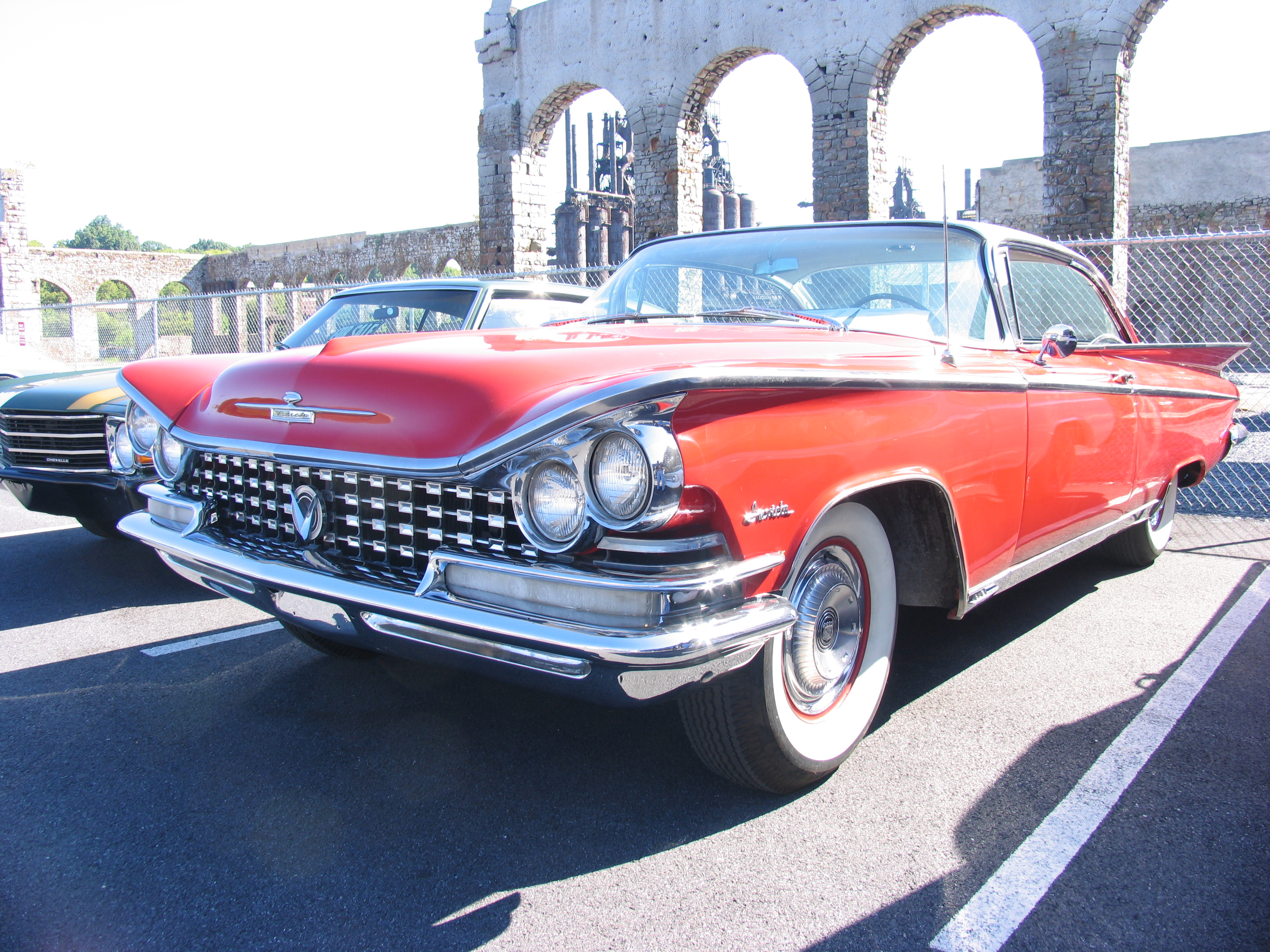
1959 Buick Invicta 2-door hardtop

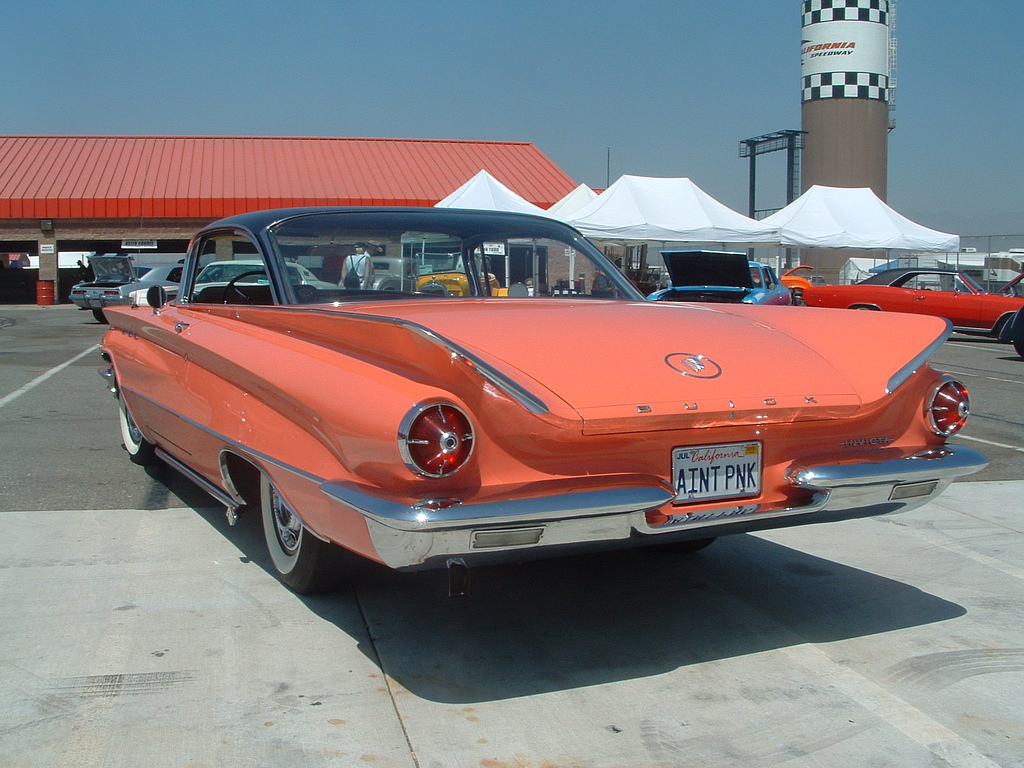
Rear view of a 1960 Buick Invicta 2-door hardtop, showing its signature delta fins

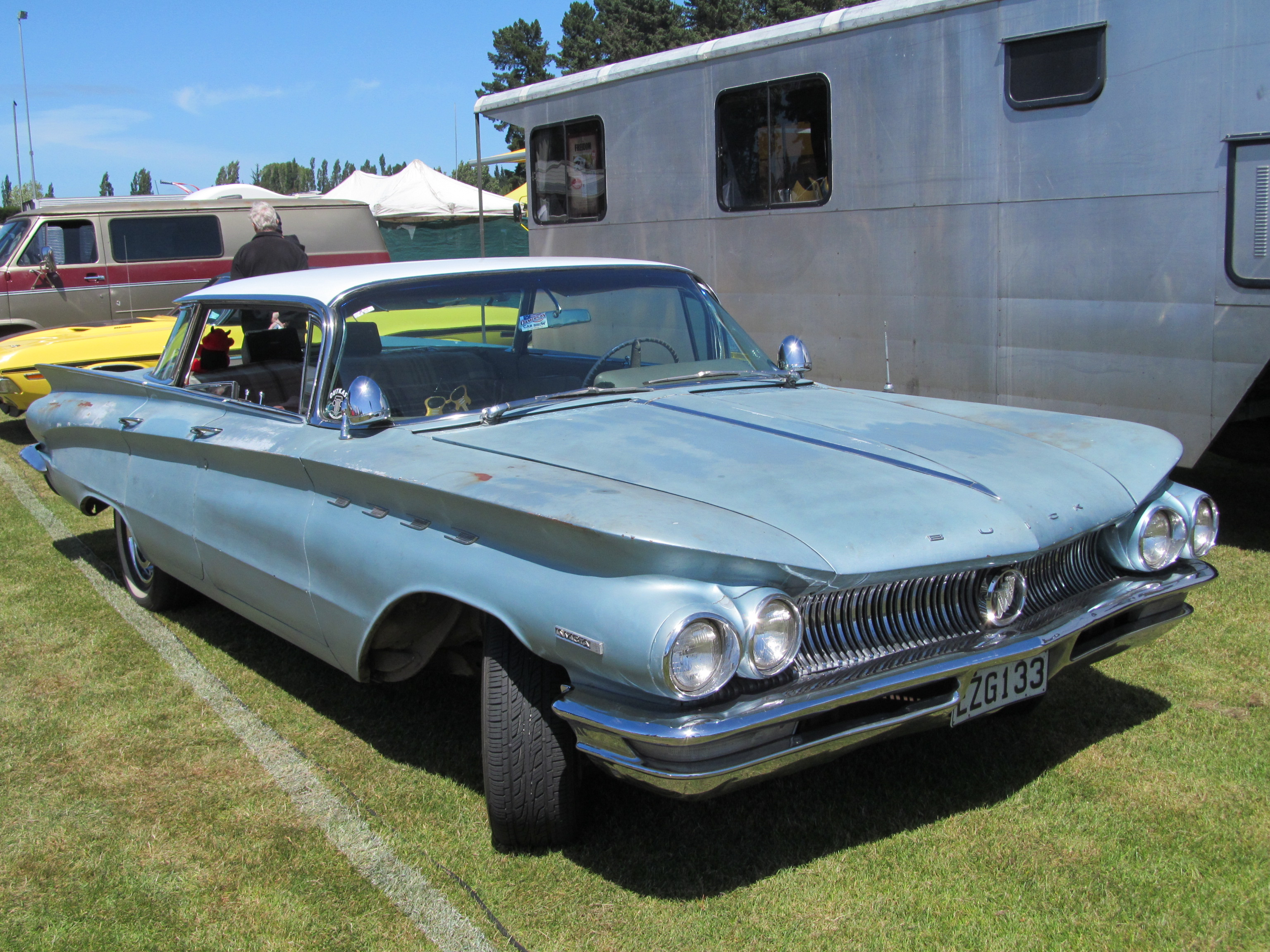
1960 Buick Invicta 4-door hardtop

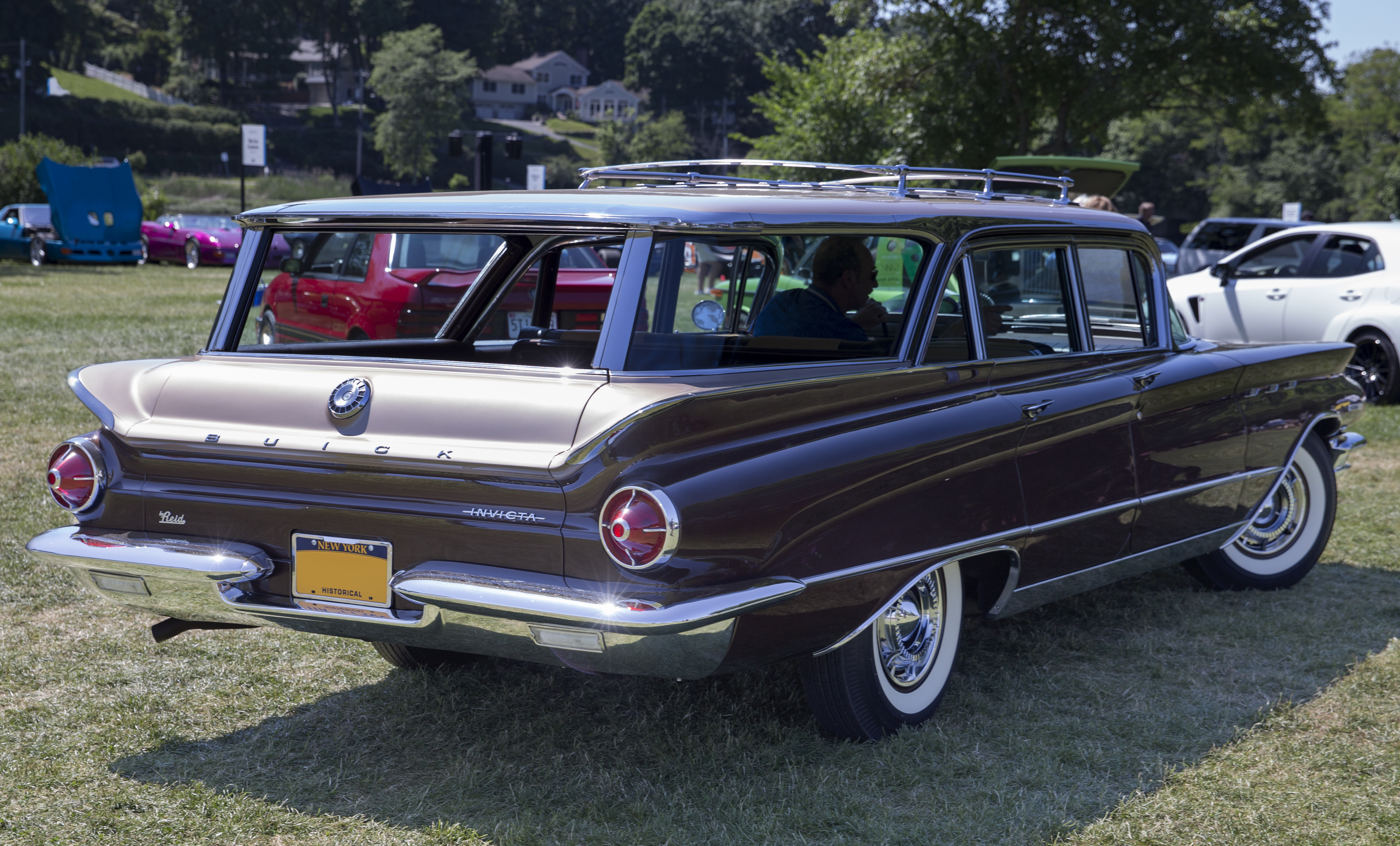
1960 Buick Invicta Custom Estate Wagon, a limited edition with a "Western" theme

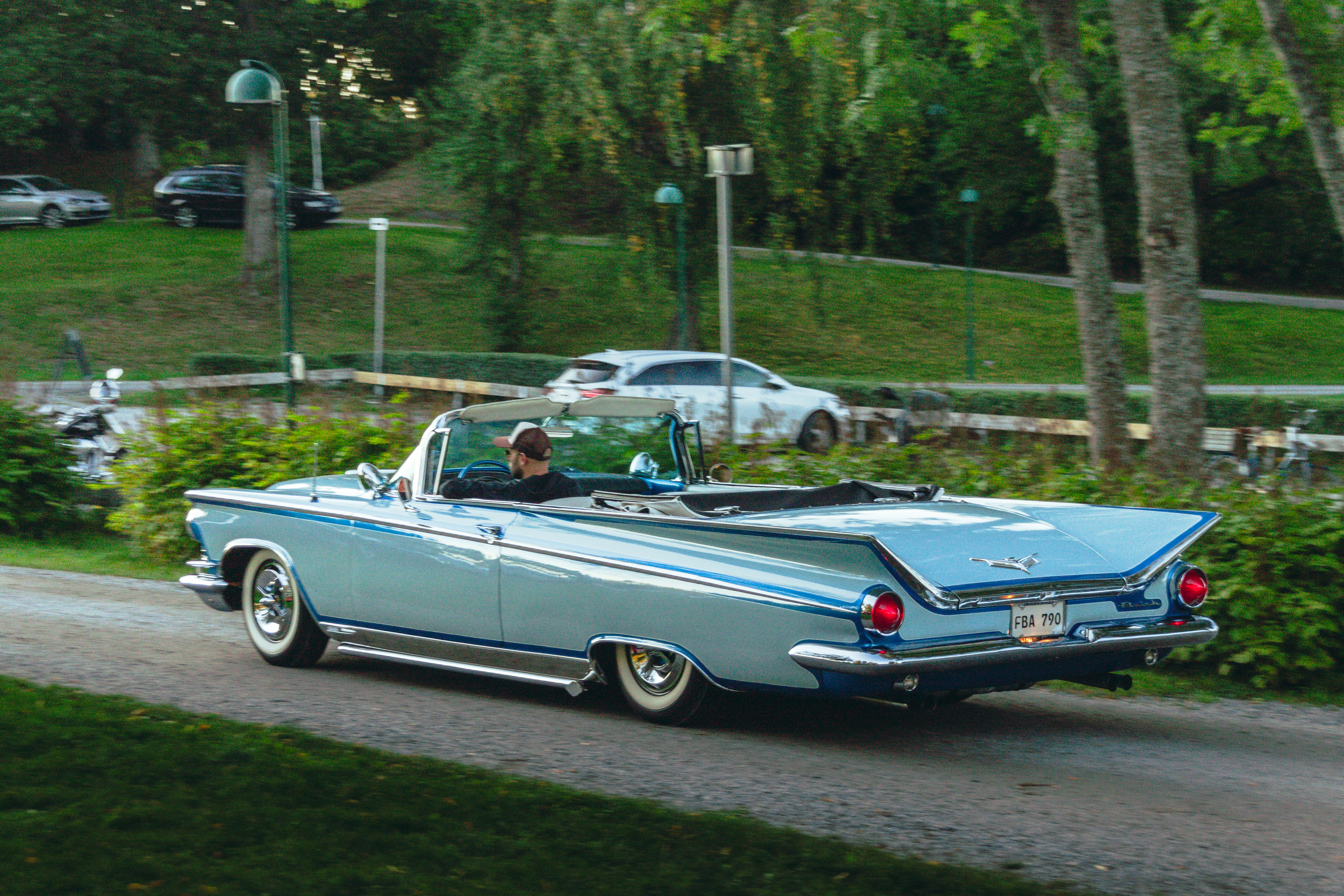
1959 Buick Invicta Convertible

== Second generation (1961–1963) ==
Second generation
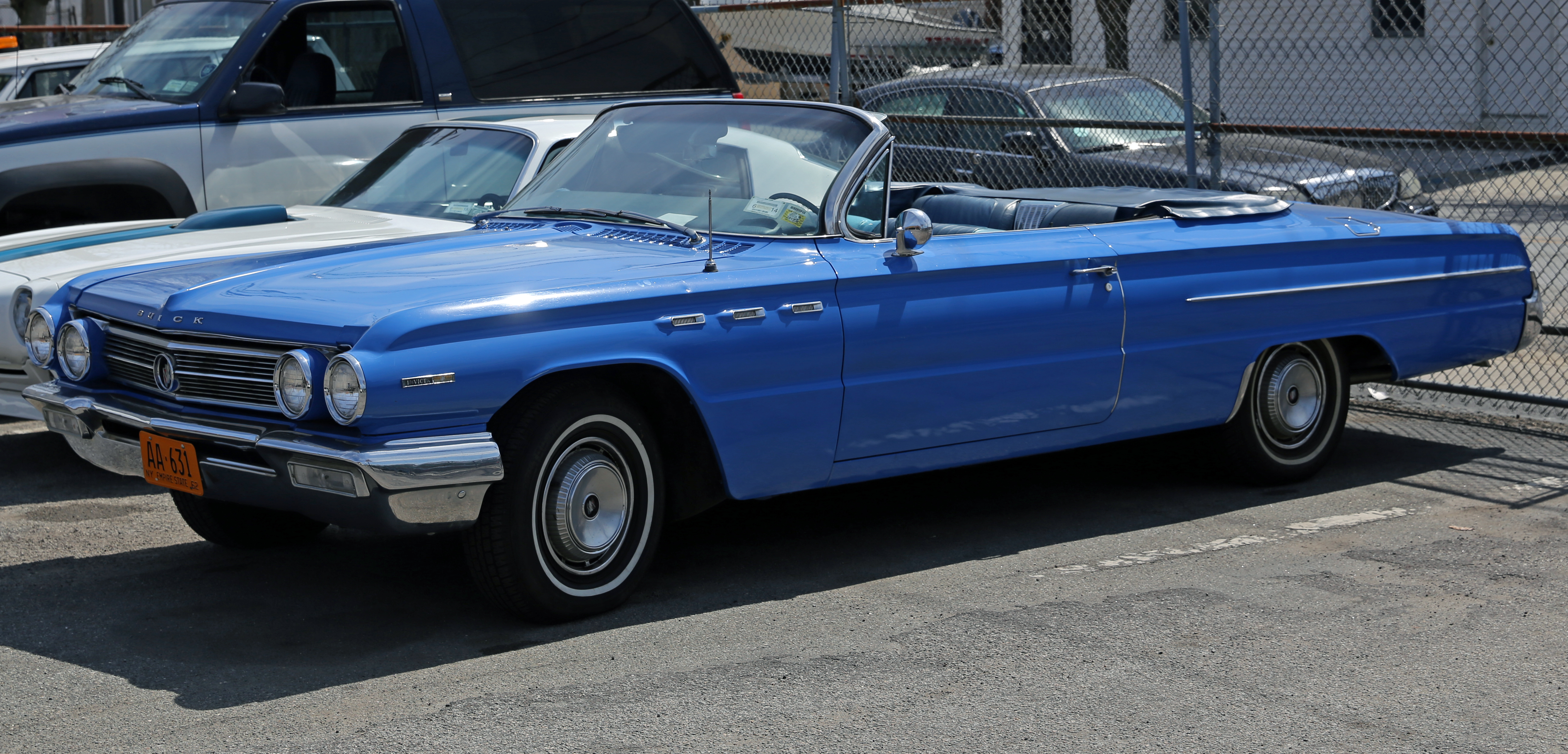
- 1962 Invicta convertible

Overview
- Model years: 1961–1963

Body and chassis
- Body style: 2-door convertible (1961–62); 2-door hardtop (1961–62); 4-door hardtop (1961–62); 4-door Estate station wagon (1962–63)

Powertrain
- Engine: 364 cu in (6.0 L) Buick V8 (1961); 401 cu in (6.6 L) Buick V8 (1961–63)
- Transmission: Turbine Drive automatic

Dimensions
- Wheelbase: 123.0 in (3,124 mm)
- Length: 213.2 in (5,415 mm) (1961); 214.1 in (5,438 mm) (1962); 215.7 in (5,479 mm) (1963)
- Width: 78.0 in (1,981 mm)
- Curb weight: 3,969–4,505 lb (1,800–2,043 kg)

The Invicta received several updates for the 1961 model year. It was the last year the 364 cubic inch Buick V8 engine was offered before the engine was retired. The station wagon did not reappear until the 1962 model year.

1962 saw the debut of the Wildcat two-door hardtop within the Invicta series. The Wildcat featured most of the interior trim of the Invicta Custom, which included standard bucket seats and upgraded door panels. Instead of the Invicta Custom's short console, however, the Wildcat had a long console with a tachometer and a shift lever. Other Wildcat features included special badging and exterior trim, along with a vinyl top and Electra 225-like taillights, rather than those of the LeSabre/Invicta. These features placed the Wildcat well in step with the shift towards sports-oriented models.

For 1963, the Wildcat would replace the Invicta four-door hardtop, two-door coupe, and convertible. The Invicta series had a 6-passenger station wagon as its sole model. Only 3,495 Invicta station wagons were built for 1963, after which the name disappeared.

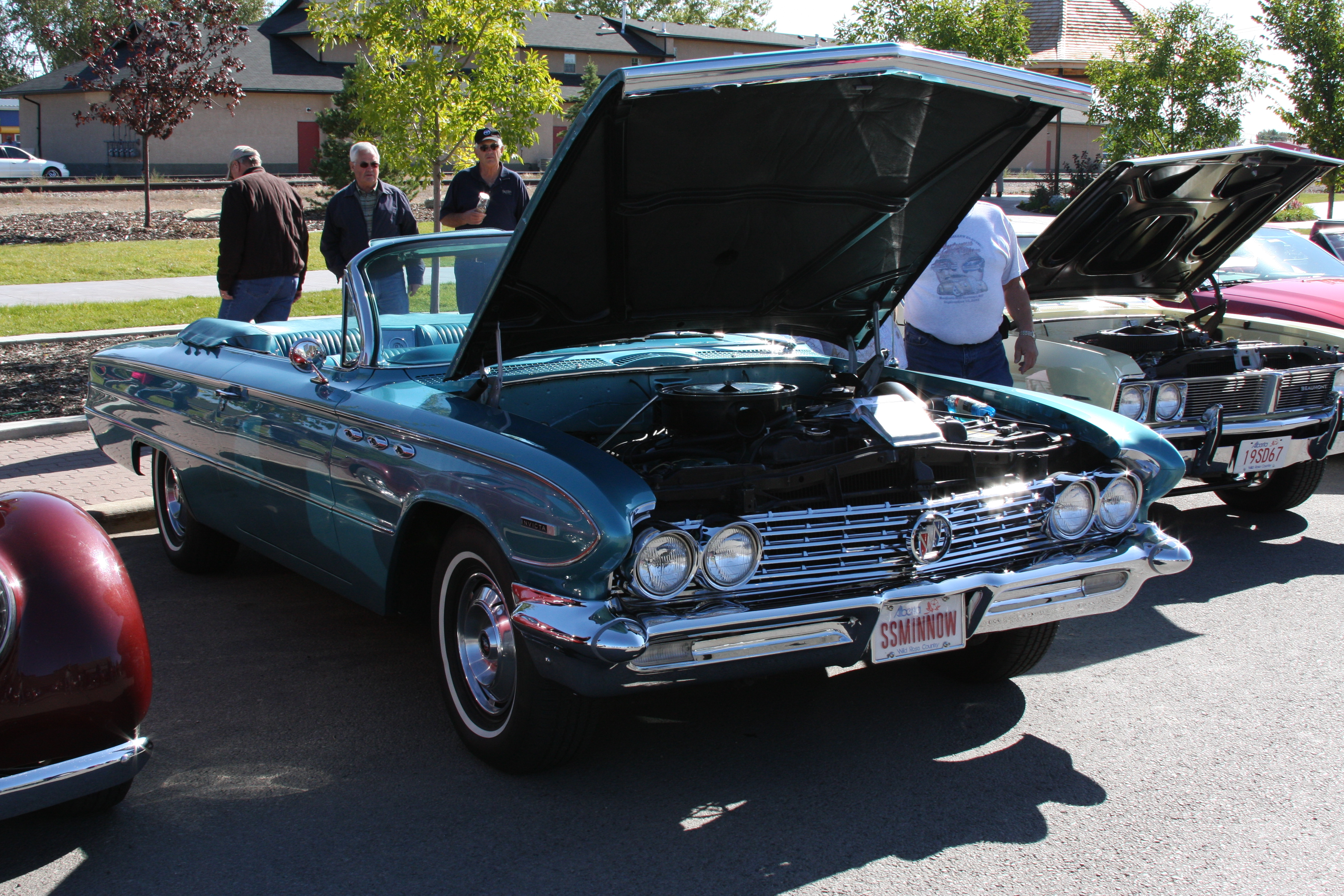
1961 Buick invicta convertible

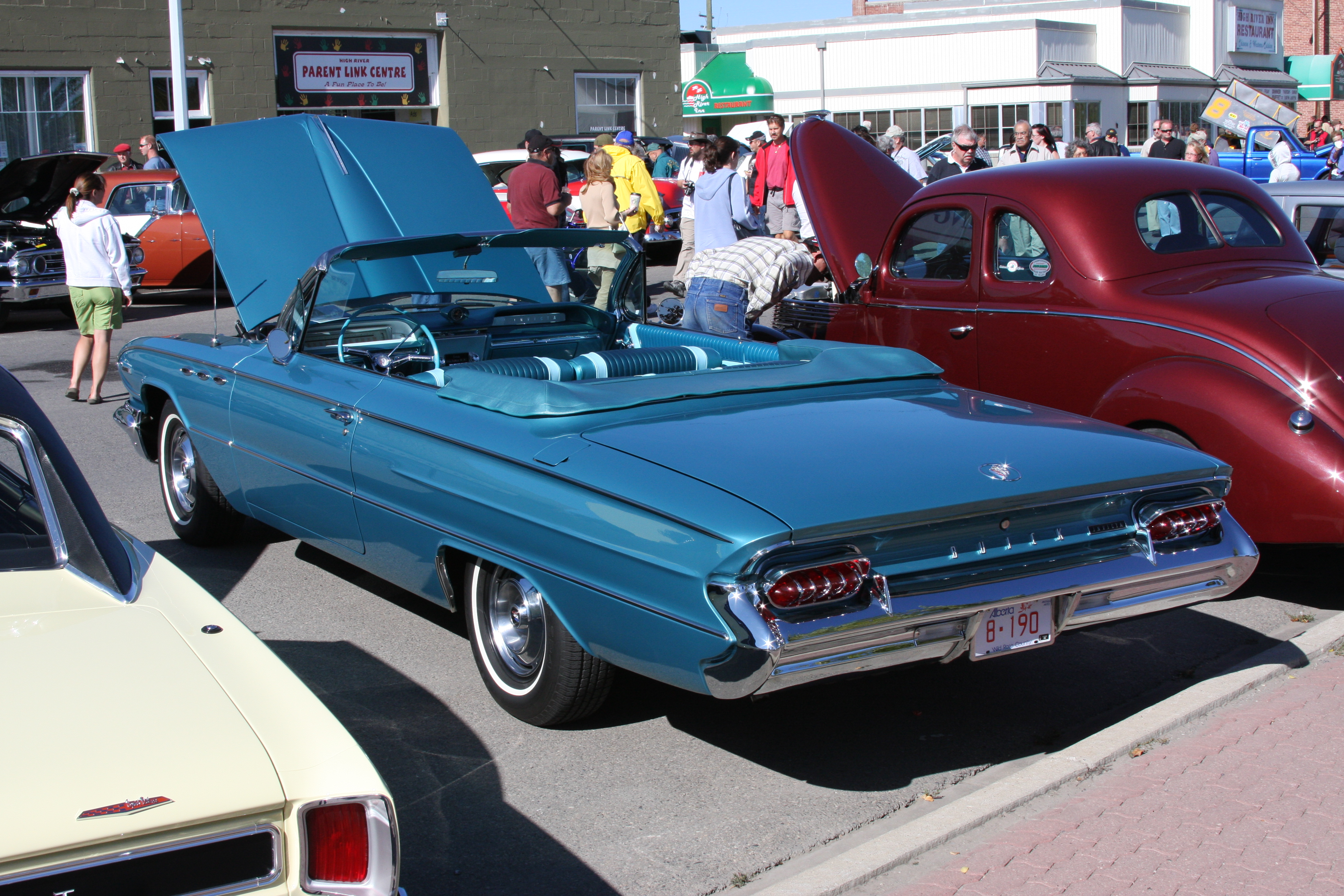
1961 Buick Invicta convertible, rear view

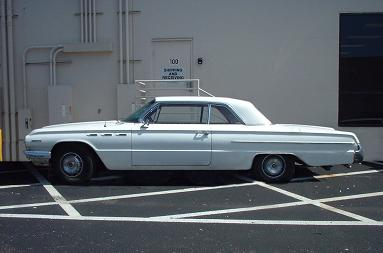
1962 Buick Invicta 2-door hardtop

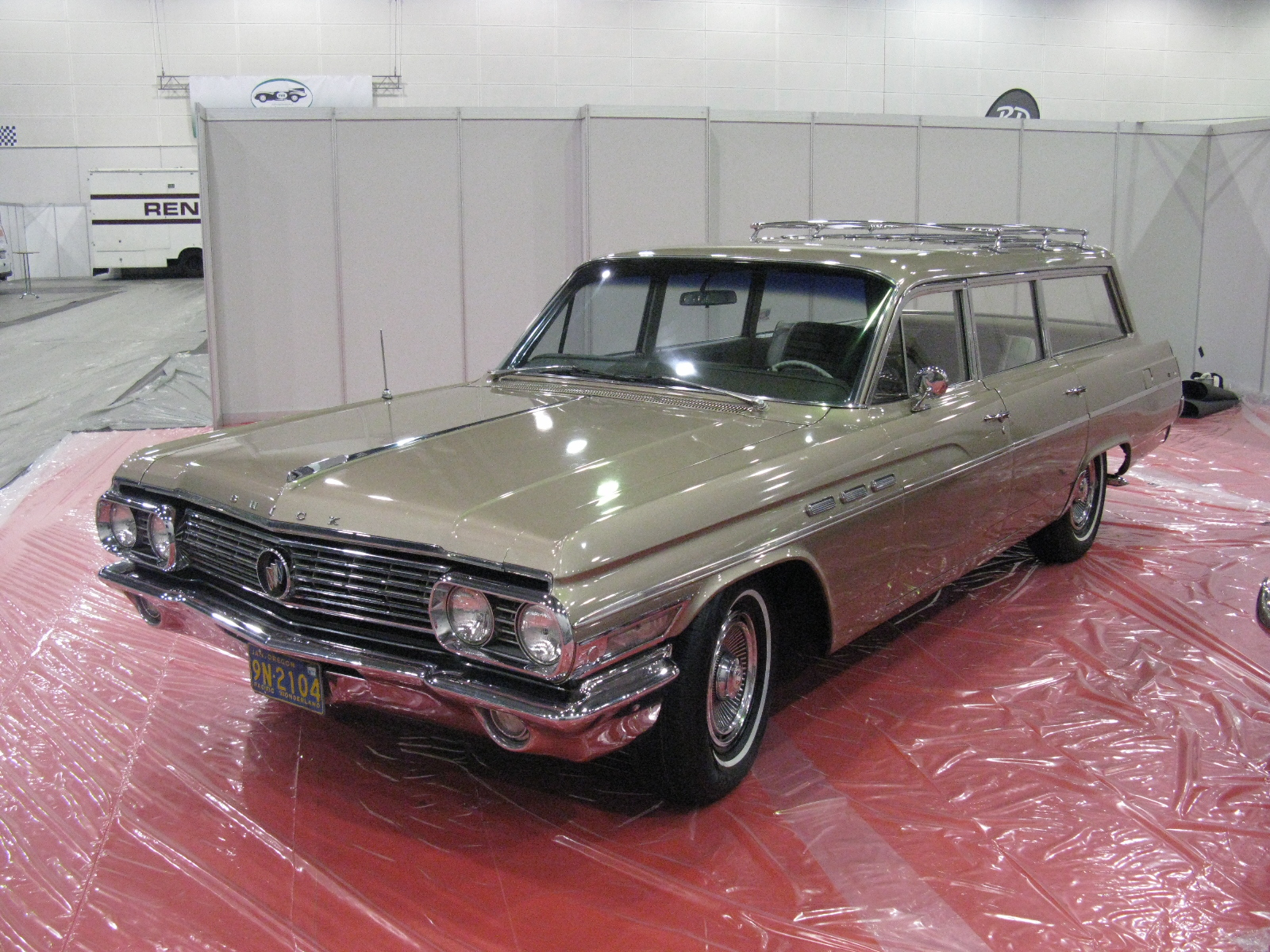
1963 Buick Invicta Estate station wagon

== Buick Invicta concept (2008) ==
2008 concept
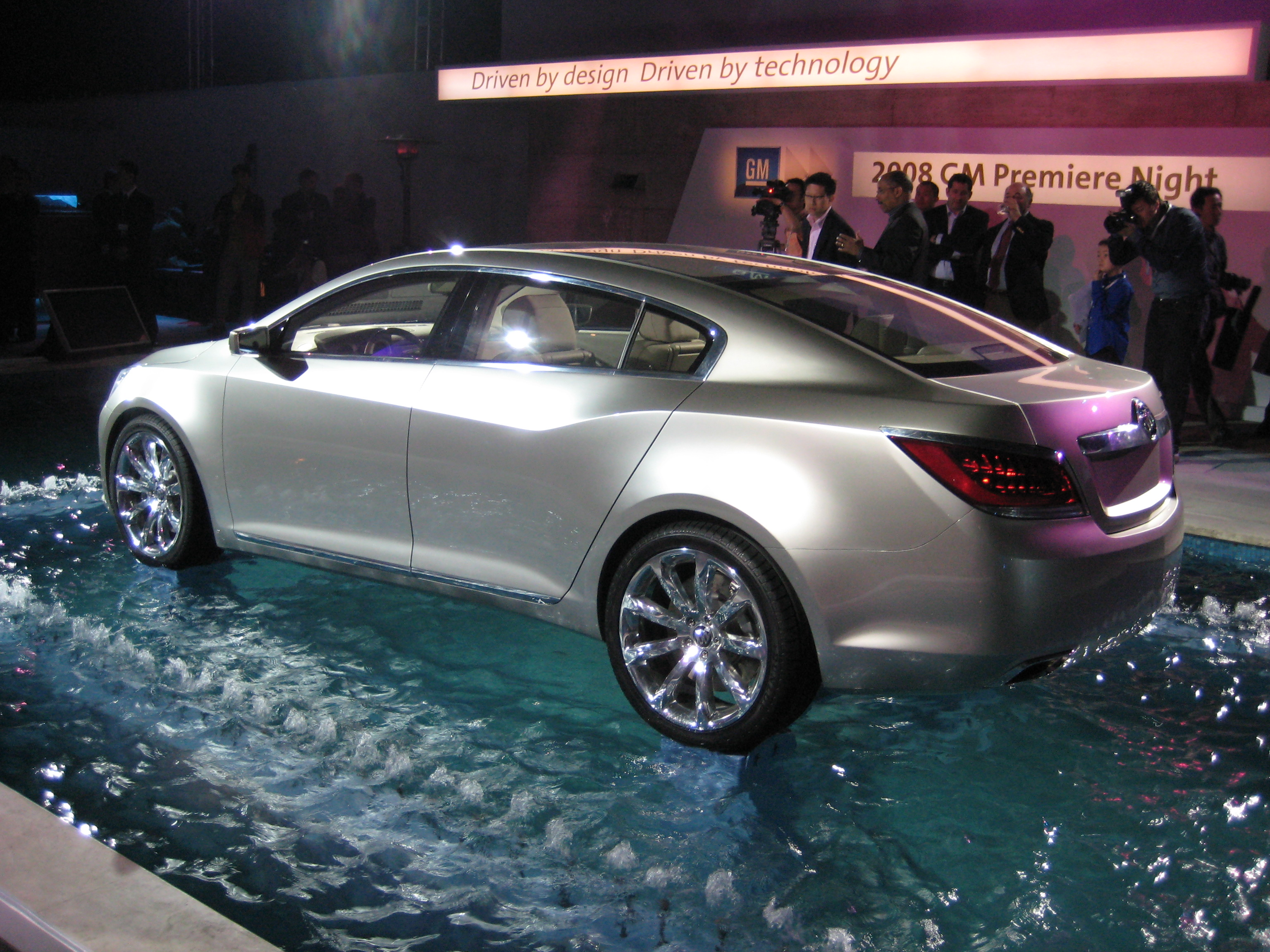
- Buick Invicta Concept 2008

Overview
- Designer: Justin Thompson and Richard Duff

Body and chassis
- Body style: 4-door sedan
- Layout: Front-engine, front-wheel-drive

Powertrain
- Engine: 2.0 L LNF I4
- Transmission: 6-speed Aisin AF40-6 automatic

Dimensions
- Wheelbase: 114.5 in (2,908 mm)
- Length: 194.2 in (4,933 mm)
- Width: 73.8 in (1,875 mm)
- Height: 57.7 in (1,466 mm)
- Curb weight: 3,750 lb (1,701 kg)

The Invicta nameplate was re-trademarked by Buick in 2004, a concept car bearing that name was unveiled at the Beijing Auto Show on April 19, 2008. The vehicle was designed in a collaboration between the General Motors Technical Center in Warren, Michigan and Pan Asia Technical Automotive Center in Shanghai, China. The designers responsible for the exterior design were Justin Thompson and Richard Duff.

The concept was equipped with a 2.0-liter direct injection turbo engine rated at 250 horsepower (186 kW) and 220 pound-feet (298 N⋅m) mated with a 6-speed automatic transmission, MacPherson strut front and independent rear suspensions, four-wheel anti-lock disc brakes, 20 x 8.5 inch polished aluminum wheels with P245/40R20 tires. Featured on the car are several traditional Buick design cues: the Sweepspear, VentiPorts, a tri-color Buick trishield, and the waterfall grille.

The vehicle's designs were later used on the second generation Buick LaCrosse.
