= Buick Centurion =

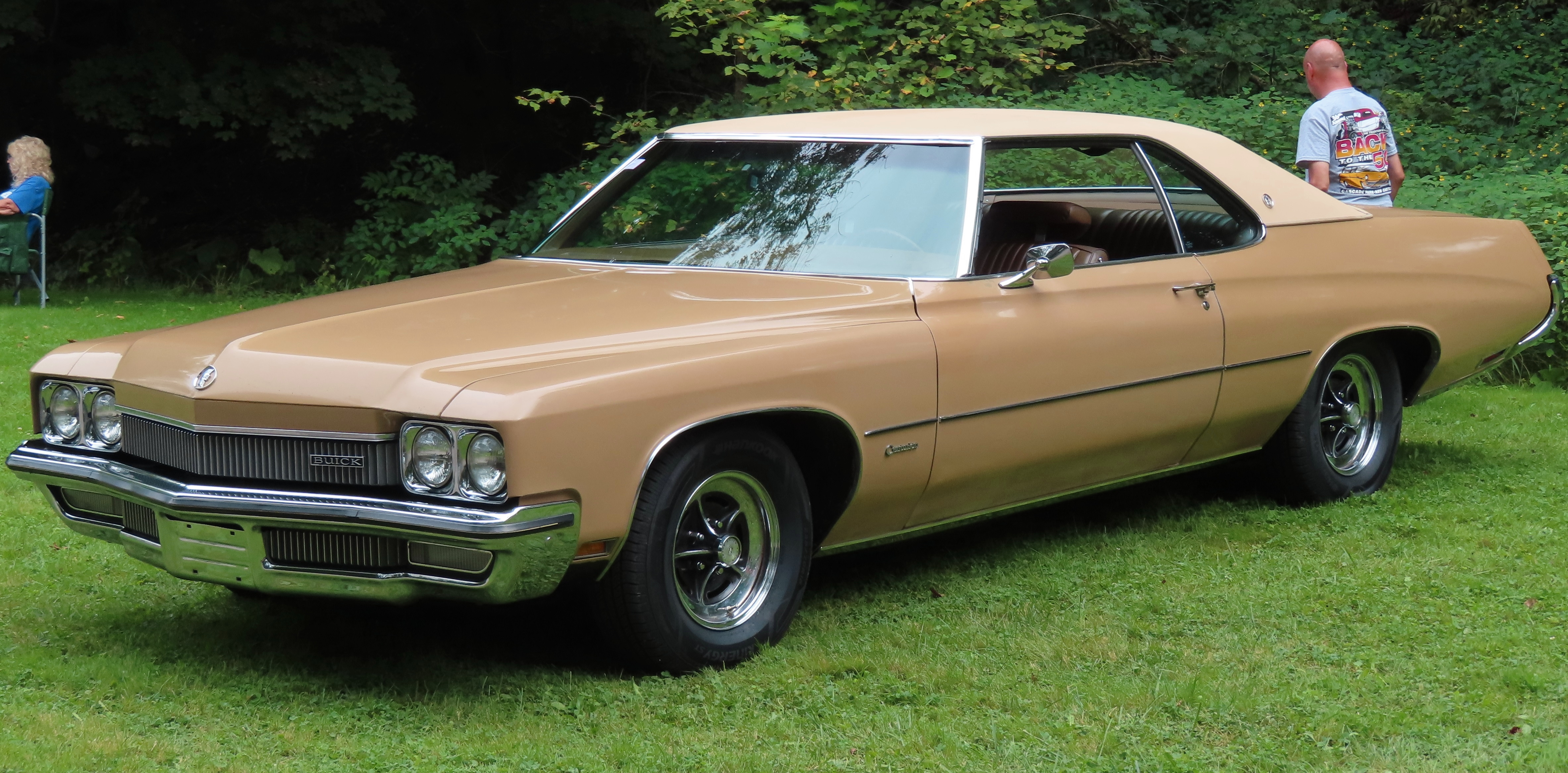
- 1972 Centurion Formal Coupe

Overview
- Manufacturer: Buick (General Motors)
- Model years: 1971–1973
- Assembly: (main plant); Flint, Michigan, USA (Buick City) (branch assembly); Kansas City, Kansas, USA (Fairfax Assembly); South Gate, California, USA (South Gate Assembly); Wilmington, Delaware, USA (Wilmington Assembly)

Body and chassis
- Body style: 2-door coupe 4-door hardtop 2-door convertible
- Layout: FR layout
- Platform: GM B platform
- Related: Oldsmobile 88 Royale; Pontiac Grand Ville; Chevrolet Caprice

Powertrain
- Engine: 350 cu in (5.7 L) V8; 455 cu in (7.5 L) V8
- Transmission: 3-speed automatic

Dimensions
- Wheelbase: 124 in (3,149.6 mm)
- Length: 224.2 in (5,694.7 mm)
- Curb weight: 4,260–4,329 lb (1,932–1,964 kg)

Chronology
- Predecessor: Buick Wildcat

The Buick Centurion is a full-size car built from the 1971 through 1973 model years. Replacing the Wildcat as the sporty iteration of Buick's three full-size car lines, it was positioned between the LeSabre and Electra in the lineup. The Centurion name was inspired by a Buick concept car, the name coming from that of an officer in the Roman Army. The car's emblem was not the traditional Buick tri-shield, but a side profile of a centurion.

The Centurion shared a trim package implementation shared with the Chevrolet Caprice, Pontiac Grand Ville and the Oldsmobile Delta 88 Royale as a hardtop coupe, sedan and convertible.

== 1956 GM Motorama showcar ==
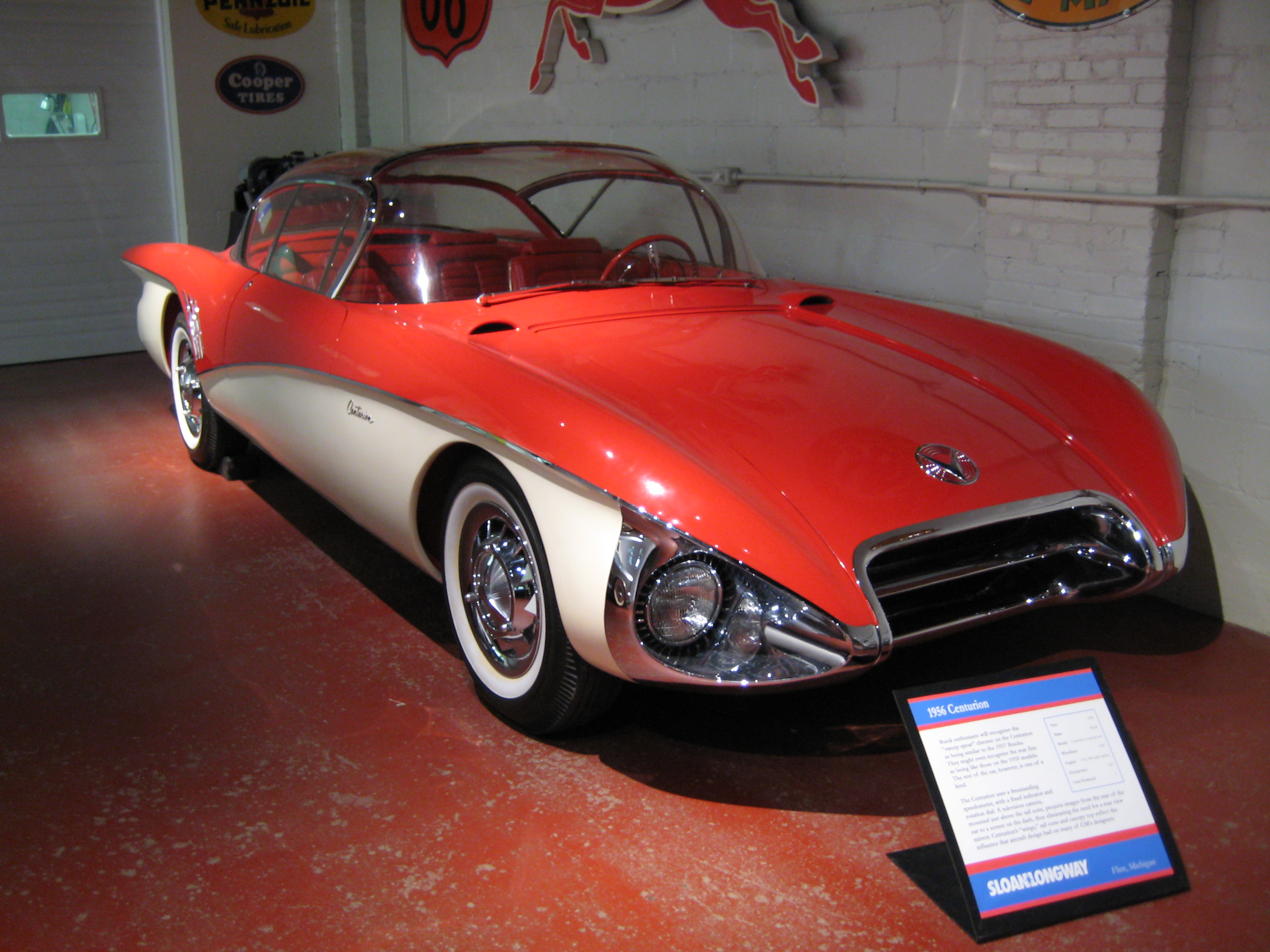
1956 concept car

The Centurion name was first used on a Buick concept car in the 1956 Motorama. It featured a red and white fiberglass body, airplane-like interior design, a fully clear "bubble top" roof and the first backup camera in place of a rear-view mirror, although it was never shown to be functional.

This car currently resides in the Sloan Museum at the Flint Cultural Center in Flint, Michigan.

== 1971–1973 ==
First seen on a concept car, the Centurion was nearly identical to the contemporaneous Buick LeSabre, differing in badging and grillework, minimal chrome trim, and an absence of the VentiPorts found on other full-size Buicks. Body styles included two-door and four-door hardtops and a convertible. There were no pillared sedans. The two-door hardtop shared the handsome semi-fastback roofline with the LeSabre and other GM B-body cars (such as the Chevrolet Impala Sport Coupe and the Olds Delta 88) along with a standard vinyl roof.

=== 1971 ===
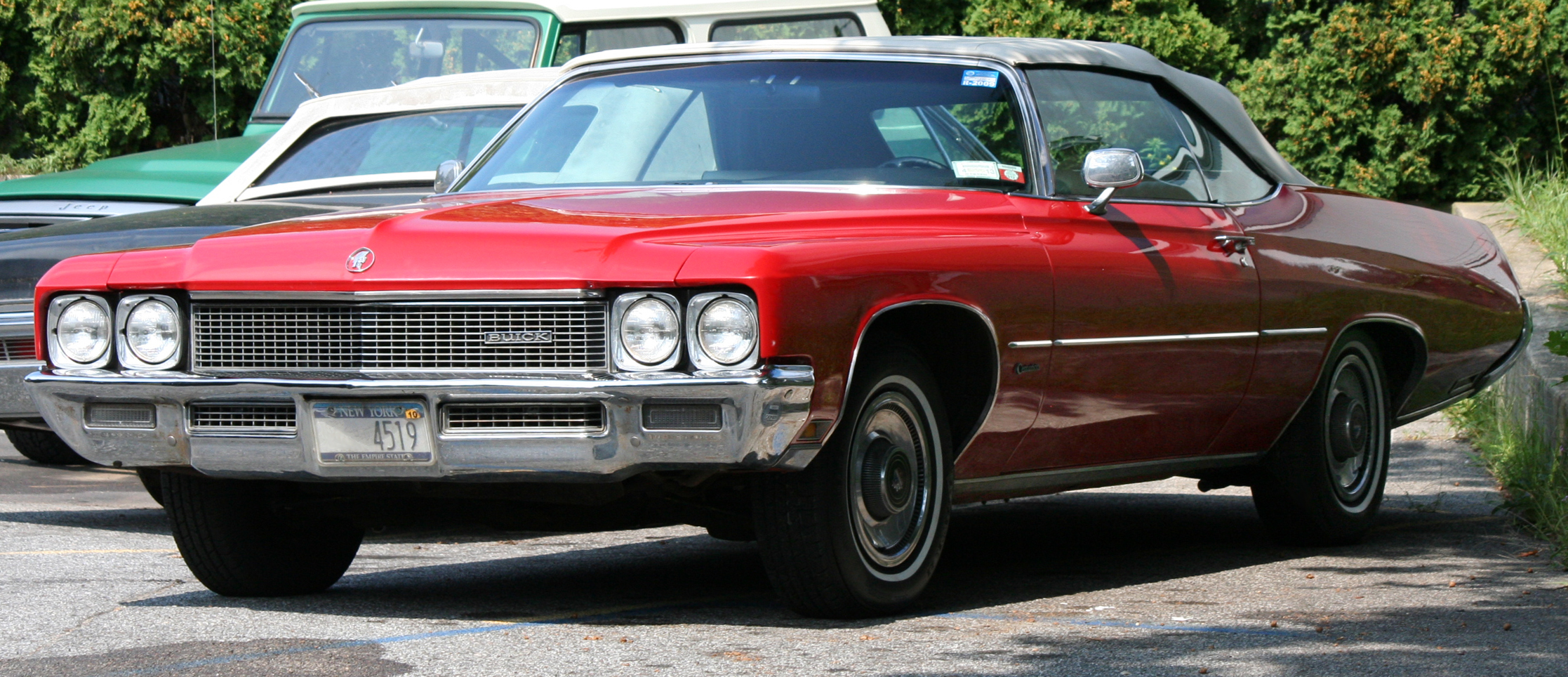
1971 Buick Centurion Convertible

Replacing the Wildcat as the mid-line full-sized Buick positioned between the lower-priced LeSabre and the larger and more luxurious C-body Electra 225, the Centurion was promoted more as a mid-level luxury car than the Wildcat, which was marketed as a sporty/luxury performance car. The Centurion was offered initially with only the 455-cubic-inch (7.5 L) big-block V8 in two power output ranges determined by the presence of either a single or dual exhaust. The 1971 Centurion produced 315 hp (235 kW) at 4400 rpm and 510 lb⋅ft (690 N⋅m) of torque at 2800 rpm with the base 455. The Centurion was also offered in the 455 Stage 1 and manual transmission configuration as well during the early portion of the 1971 model year, shared with the Buick GSX. This was known as the A9 and B6 Option when ordering the car. What also separated the car from the LeSabre was that when the car would be ordered or recognized as a Centurion it would be branded as a 4P Series as the first two letters of the Vehicle Identification Number.

Interior trim was upgraded from LeSabres with a notchback bench seat including center armrest standard equipment along with more luxurious cloth-and-vinyl or all-vinyl upholstery.

In March 1971, the three-speed Turbo Hydra-matic transmission became standard on all Centurions as well as the lower-priced LeSabres. Variable-ratio power steering and power front disc brakes were standard equipment during the entire model year.

Total sales were 29,398, exceeding the Wildcat by nearly 25%.

=== 1972 ===
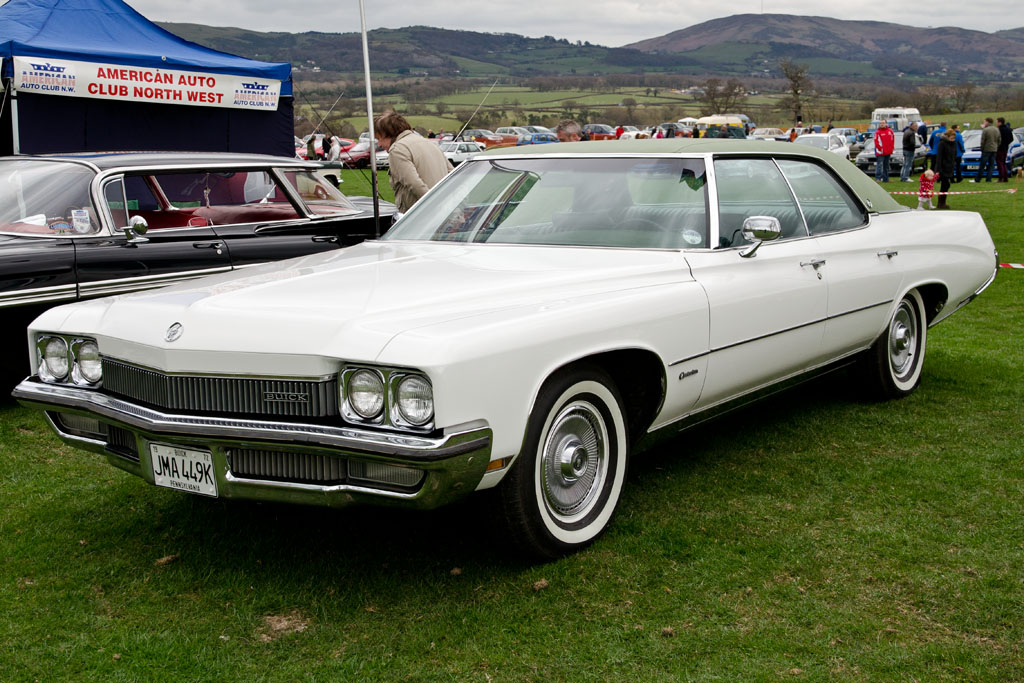
1972 Buick Centurion 4-Door Hardtop

The 1972 Centurion featured minor appearance changes including a revised vertical bar grille and taillight lenses.

Under the hood, the standard and only available 455 cubic-inch V8 was rated at 250 net horsepower, which represented an "on-paper" decrease from the 315 gross horsepower rating in 1971. This was due to an industry-wide change in horsepower measurements from the gross method by a dynamometer outside a vehicle with no accessories installed to a SAE net method in which horsepower was measured as installed in a vehicle with accessories and emission controls hooked up. Turbo Hydra-matic transmission, variable ratio power steering and power front disc brakes were again standard equipment.

Sales climbed over 20%, to 36,165 for the model year.

=== 1973 ===
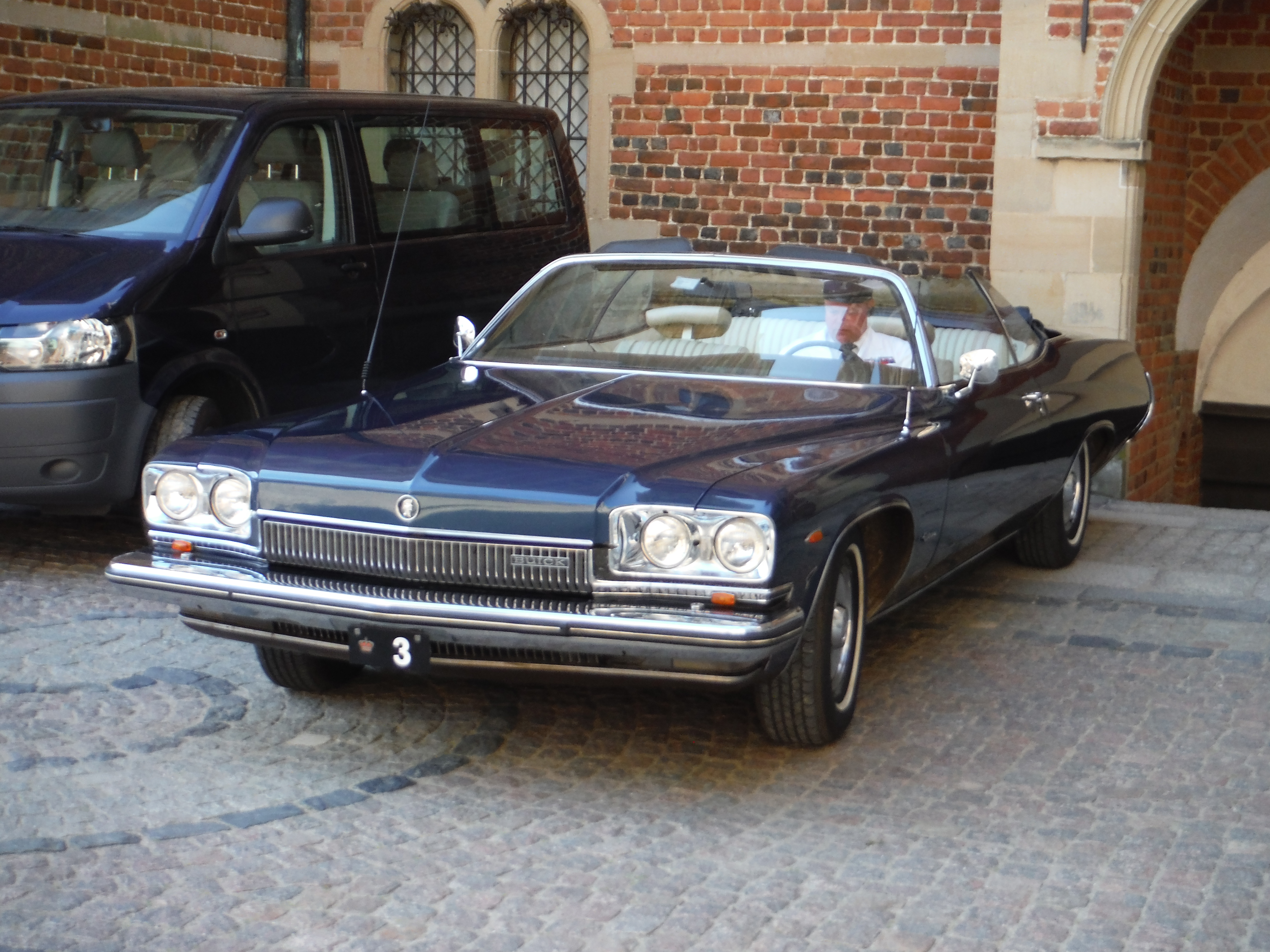
1973 Buick Centurion Convertible owned by the Royal house of Denmark, used by Henrik, Prince Consort

The 1973 Centurion featured a larger 5 mph (8.0 km/h) front bumper and new vertical grille shared with LeSabre models along with revised taillights. The two-door hardtop coupe no longer included a standard vinyl roof and the distinctive formal rear window was replaced by a backlight shared with LeSabre coupes.

Under the hood, the standard engine was downgraded to a four-barrel 350 V8 rated at 175 net horsepower. The 250-horsepower 455 four-barrel was now optional.

With the LeSabre convertible temporarily dropped after 1972 and the intermediate-sized Buick lineup (renamed from Skylark to Century for 1973) losing its droptop permanently after the 1972 model year, the Centurion was Buick's only convertible offering in 1973. This would also be the final year for the Centurion series, which was replaced for 1974 by the new LeSabre Luxus, which included the convertible reinstated to that line for another two model years. GM would not see another Buick convertible until the Buick Riviera in 1982.

Total Centurion production was 110,539 units, including 10,296 convertibles. With only three years of production, the Centurion had one of the shortest model runs in modern Buick history.
