= Buick Wildcat =

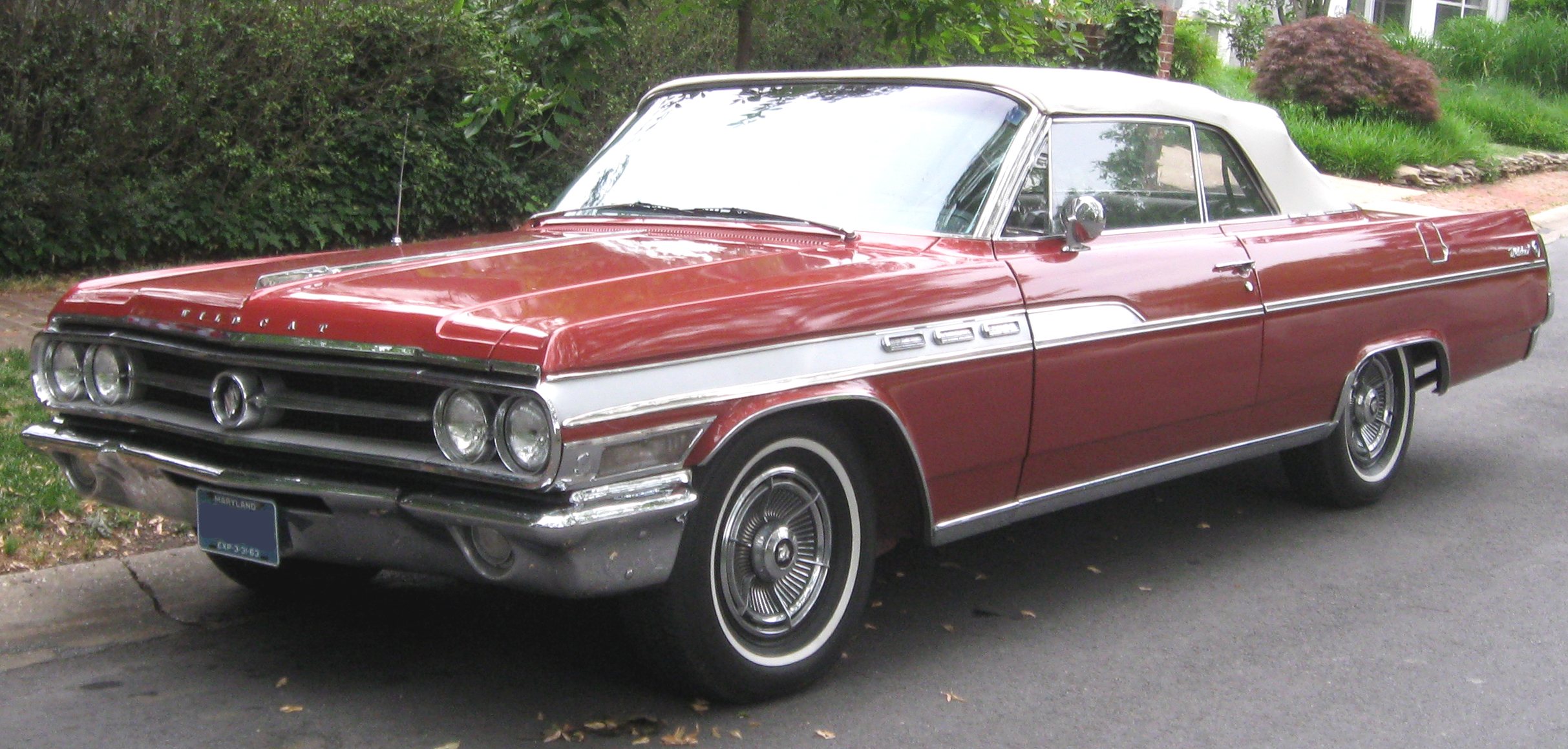
- 1963 Wildcat

Overview
- Manufacturer: Buick (General Motors)
- Production: 1963–1970

Body and chassis
- Class: Full-size car
- Body style: 2-door hardtop 2-door convertible 4-door hardtop 4-door sedan
- Layout: FR layout
- Platform: B-body

Chronology
- Predecessor: Buick Invicta
- Successor: Buick Centurion

The Buick Wildcat is a full-size car that was produced by Buick from the 1963 to 1970 model years. Taking its name from a series of 1950s Buick concept cars, the Wildcat replaced the Invicta within the "junior" B-body Buick sedan range. Serving as the higher-performance full-size Buick, the Wildcat was slotted between the LeSabre and the larger C-body Electra.

Following two generations of the model line, the Wildcat was replaced by the Buick Centurion for 1971.

== Background ==
In 1962 the Wildcat was a Buick Invicta subseries, mating the Invicta's longer full-size two-door hardtop Buick body (known as the "sport coupe", body production code 4647 hardtop only) with a high-performance 325 hp (242 kW) version of the 401 cu in (6.6 L) Nailhead V8, known as the "Wildcat 445" for producing 445 lb⋅ft (603 N⋅m) of torque. To further distance itself from the Invicta, the Wildcat had Electra 225-like taillights, a bucket seat interior, and a center console with tachometer and transmission shifter. It had a Dynaflow transmission shared by all full-sized Buicks, plus special exterior side trim, vinyl-covered roof (new for 1962), and its own unique emblem: a stylized head of a wild cat, located on each of the C-pillars. However, the Wildcat did share the LeSabre's and Invicta's trio of VentiPorts on the front fenders, a design cue lasting only through the 1963 model year. The listed retail price was $3,927 ($41,797 in 2025 dollars)

== First generation (1963–1964) ==
First generation
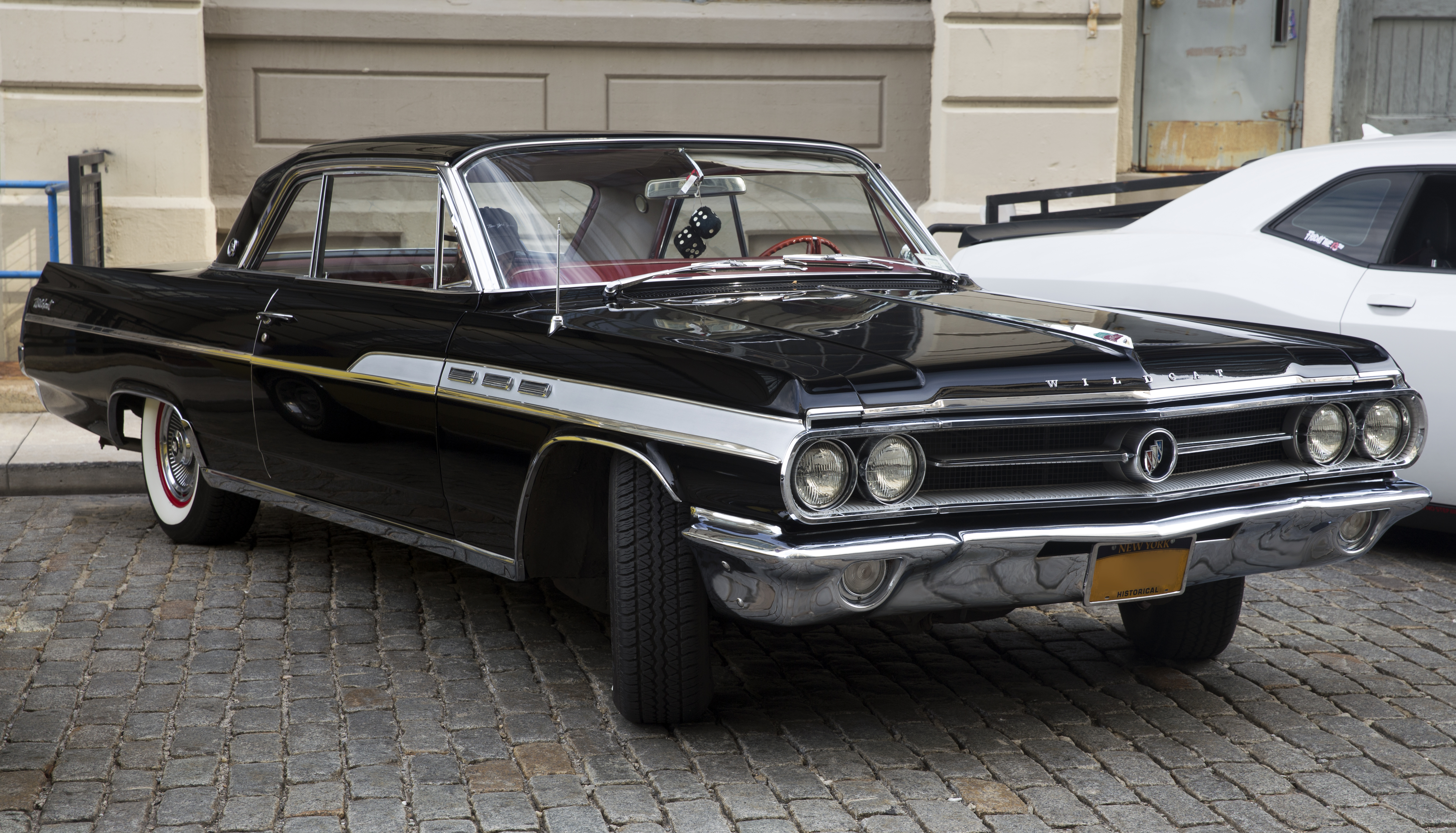
- 1963 two-door hardtop coupe

Overview
- Model years: 1963–1964
- Assembly: (main plant); Flint, Michigan, USA (Buick City) (branch assembly); Doraville, Georgia, USA (Doraville Assembly) "Atlanta"; Kansas City, Kansas, USA (Fairfax Assembly); Linden, New Jersey, USA (Linden Assembly); South Gate, California, USA (South Gate Assembly); Wilmington, Delaware, USA (Wilmington Assembly)

Body and chassis
- Body style: 2-door hardtop 2-door convertible 4-door hardtop 4-door sedan
- Layout: FR layout
- Related: Pontiac Grand Prix; Oldsmobile Starfire; Chevrolet Impala SS

Powertrain
- Engine: 401 cu in (6.6 L) Buick V8; 425 cu in (7.0 L) Buick V8
- Transmission: Dynaflow automatic 3-speed TH-400 automatic 3-speed manual 4-speed manual

Dimensions
- Wheelbase: 123 in (3,124 mm)
- Length: 215.7 in (5,479 mm)
- Curb weight: 3,871–3,961 lb (1,756–1,797 kg)

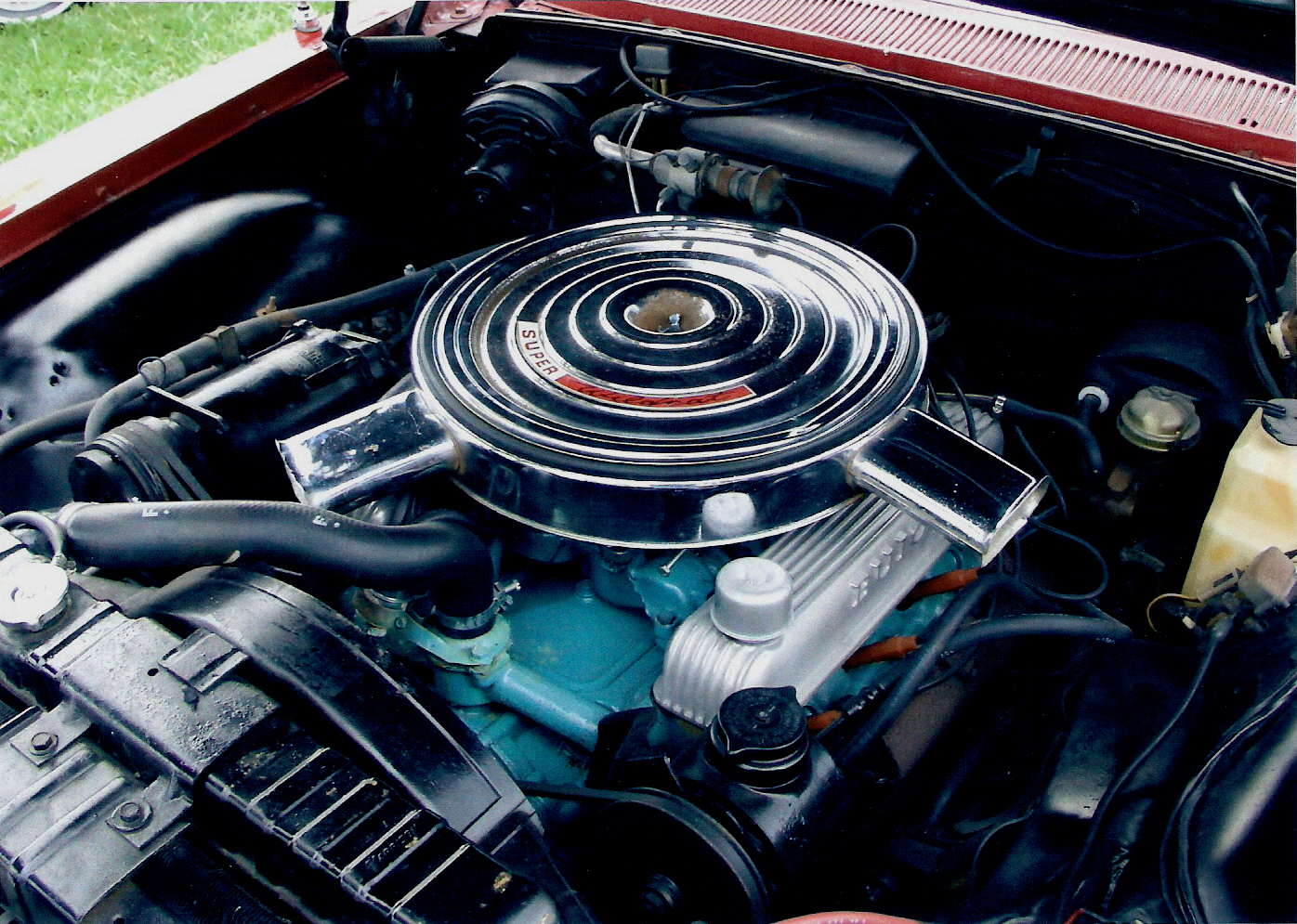
View of the "Super Wildcat" engine

From 1963 to 1970 the Wildcat was its own series, no longer an Invicta subseries. The 1963 model had a large aluminum trim panel on the side, while 1964 models had vertically situated chrome hash-marks on the lower front quarter panel directly behind the front wheel housings and did not have the traditional horizontal VentiPorts like other Buicks. After becoming its own full series in 1963, the Wildcat added a convertible and four-door hardtop sedan to the original two-door hardtop coupe introduced in 1962. In the four-door version, a bench seat was standard but the bucket seat and console interior used in the coupe and convertible were optional. In 1964, a pillared four-door sedan was added to the line and two levels of trim were available - standard and custom, with a mid-line deluxe subseries added for 1965 only. From 1966 to 1969, the base (with trim similar to the 1965 Wildcat deluxe) and custom trims were again the sole options. The Wildcat's wheelbase was 123 in (3,124 mm) in comparison to the top level Electra at 126 in (3,200 mm). The listed retail price for the Sport Coupe 2-door hardtop was $3,849 ($40,477 in 2025 dollars).

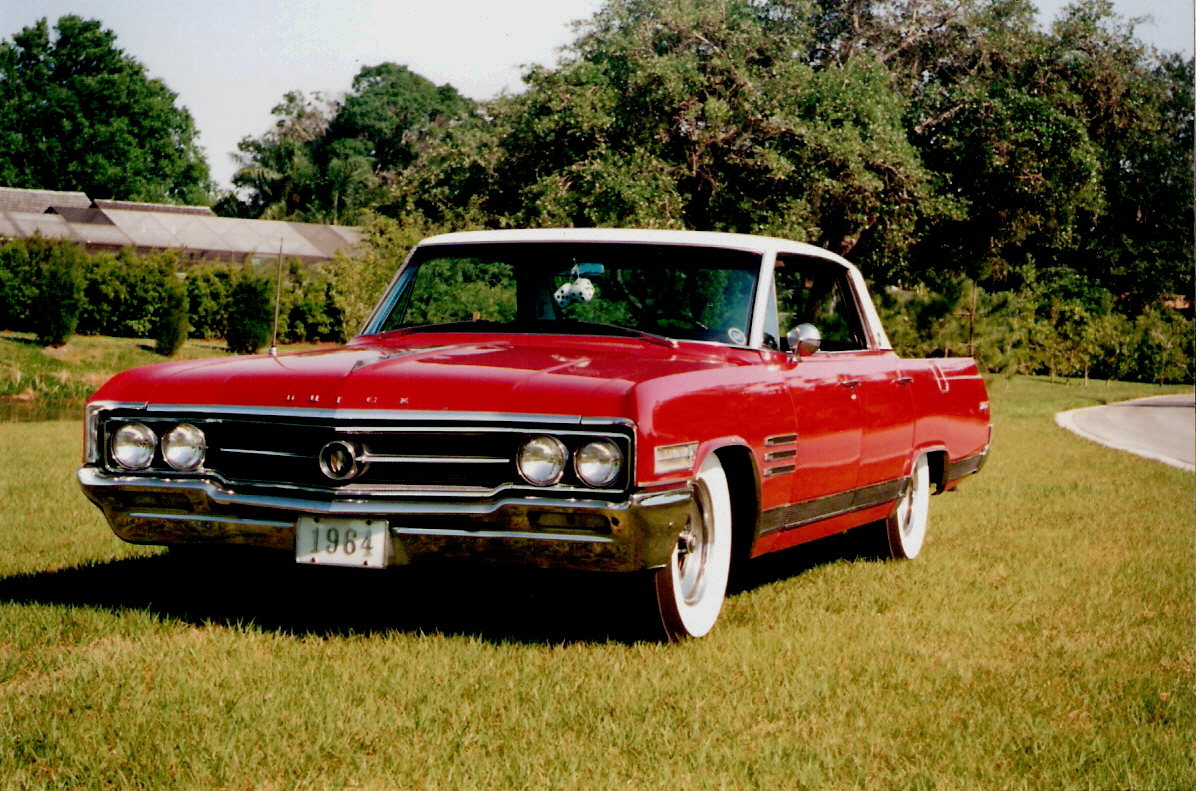
1964 Buick Super Wildcat four-door hardtop

The 325 hp (242 kW) 401 cubic-inch Wildcat V8 remained the standard engine through 1966. From 1964 to 1966 a larger, 425 cubic-inch, Wildcat V8 was also available, producing either 340 hp (254 kW) with a factory four-barrel carburetor or 360 hp (268 kW) with two four-barrel carburetors ("dual quads"). This version also featured finned cast aluminum valve covers with the Buick logo embossed on the top. Also beginning in 1964, a three-speed manual transmission with column shift became standard equipment on all Wildcats, with either the four-speed manual (1963-1965 only) or three-speed automatic Super Turbine 400 transmissions as options. Engine names referred to engine torque output rather than displacement. The "Wildcat 445" was a 401 CID V8 that produced a peak torque rating of 445 lb⋅ft (603 N⋅m), while the "Wildcat 465" was a 425 CID V8 that produced 465 lb⋅ft (630 N⋅m) of torque. The "dual quad" version of the Wildcat 465 was dubbed "Super Wildcat".

Buick Wildcat Production Figures
	Yearly Total
1963	35,725
1964	84,245
Total	119,970

== Second generation (1965–1970) ==
Second generation
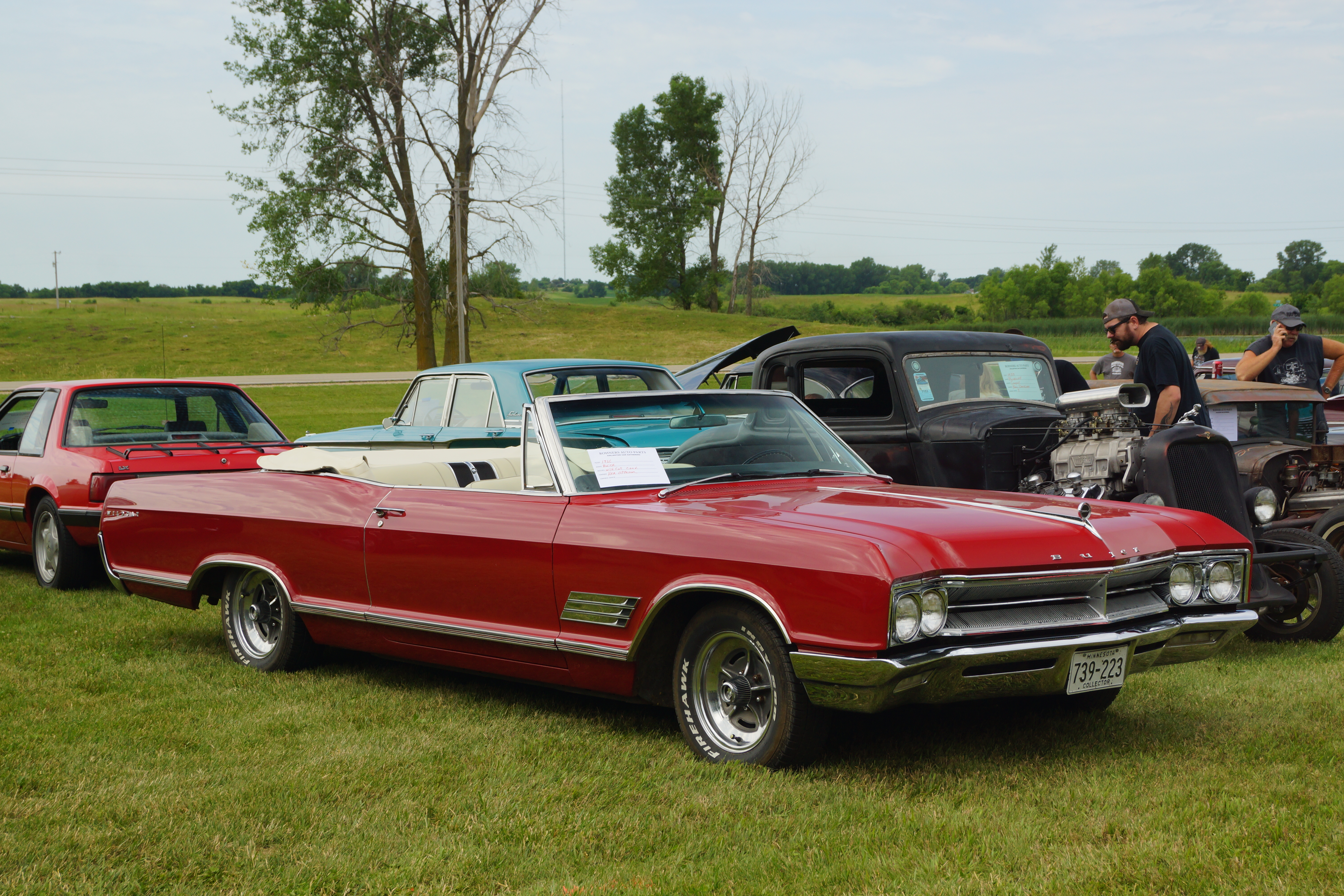
- 1966 convertible

Overview
- Model years: 1965–1970
- Assembly: (main plant); Flint, Michigan, USA (Buick City) (branch assembly); Doraville, Georgia, USA (Doraville Assembly) "Atlanta"; Kansas City, Kansas, USA (Fairfax Assembly); South Gate, California, USA (South Gate Assembly); Wilmington, Delaware, USA (Wilmington Assembly); Oshawa, Ontario, Canada (Oshawa Assembly)

Body and chassis
- Body style: 2-door hardtop 2-door convertible 4-door hardtop 4-door sedan
- Layout: FR layout
- Related: Pontiac Grand Prix; Oldsmobile Starfire; Chevrolet Impala SS

Powertrain
- Engine: 401 cu in (6.6 L) Buick V8; 425 cu in (7.0 L) Buick V8; 430 cu in (7.0 L) Buick V8; 455 cu in (7.5 L) Buick V8
- Transmission: 3-speed TH-400 automatic 3-speed manual 4-speed manual

Dimensions
- Wheelbase: 126 in (3,200.4 mm) (1965-1968); 123.2 in (3,129.3 mm) (1969); 124 in (3,149.6 mm) (1970)
- Length: 219.8 in (5,582.9 mm)
- Curb weight: 3,117–3,651 lb (1,414–1,656 kg)

In 1966 a one-year-only Wildcat "Gran Sport Performance Group" package could be ordered by selecting the "A8/Y48" option. Two engine choices were available. The single carb 425 CID/340 hp V8 was included in the base package price with a 360 hp (268 kW) dual-carb set-up available at extra cost. Initially, this 20 hp (15 kW) upgrade remained a dealer-installed carb-intake modification bolted to stock MT-coded engines but eventually these "Super Wildcats" could also be obtained direct from the factory with MZ-coded engines. Rounding out both the base and Super GS packages were dual exhaust, heavy-duty suspension, posi-traction and updated rear quarter-panel "GS" badging in the new, initials-only format employed on all post-1965 Gran Sports. A total of 1,244 Wildcat GSs were built by Buick during the model year. Of those, 242 were convertibles and the rest were hardtops. A mere 22 (consisting of an unknown mix of both body styles) were Super Wildcats.

A styling appearance cue was adopted from the popular 1963 Buick Riviera, where the beltline arched up over the rear wheels, a modification of an older styling element called the "Sweepspear," with later vehicles installing a rub strip along the entire side of the vehicle tapering down as it reached the rear bumper.

The year 1967 brought a new engine to the Wildcat line (along with the Riviera and Electra 225) – a 430-cubic-inch V8 with four-barrel carburetor and 360 hp (268 kW) rating that featured larger valves for better breathing than the previous 401/425 Nailhead design that dated back to Buick's first V8, in 1953. It had a 10.25:1 compression ratio and a four-barrel carburettor, with maximum power reached at 5,000 rpm and 475 lb⋅ft (644 N⋅m) of torque at 3,200 rpm - all SAE gross values. The 430 was relatively short-lived as it was only offered through the 1969 model year. For 1970, the 430 was superseded by the largest Buick V8 engine ever – a 455-cubic-inch engine that was basically a bored version of the previous engine with the same large-valve design, a horsepower rating of 370, and torque rating of more than 500 pounds.

1967 and 1968 saw the addition of new federally-mandated safety equipment that provided better occupant protection in collisions, and accident avoidance features as well. Like other full-size U.S. cars of the late 1960s, the Buicks became bigger, plusher, and less economical.

The Wildcat was offered only in Custom trim for its final year of 1970. It was replaced by the Buick Centurion for 1971.

Buick Wildcat Production Figures
	Yearly Total
1965	68,233
1966	68,584
1967	68,095
1968	73,561
1969	67,453
1970	23,645
Total	369,571

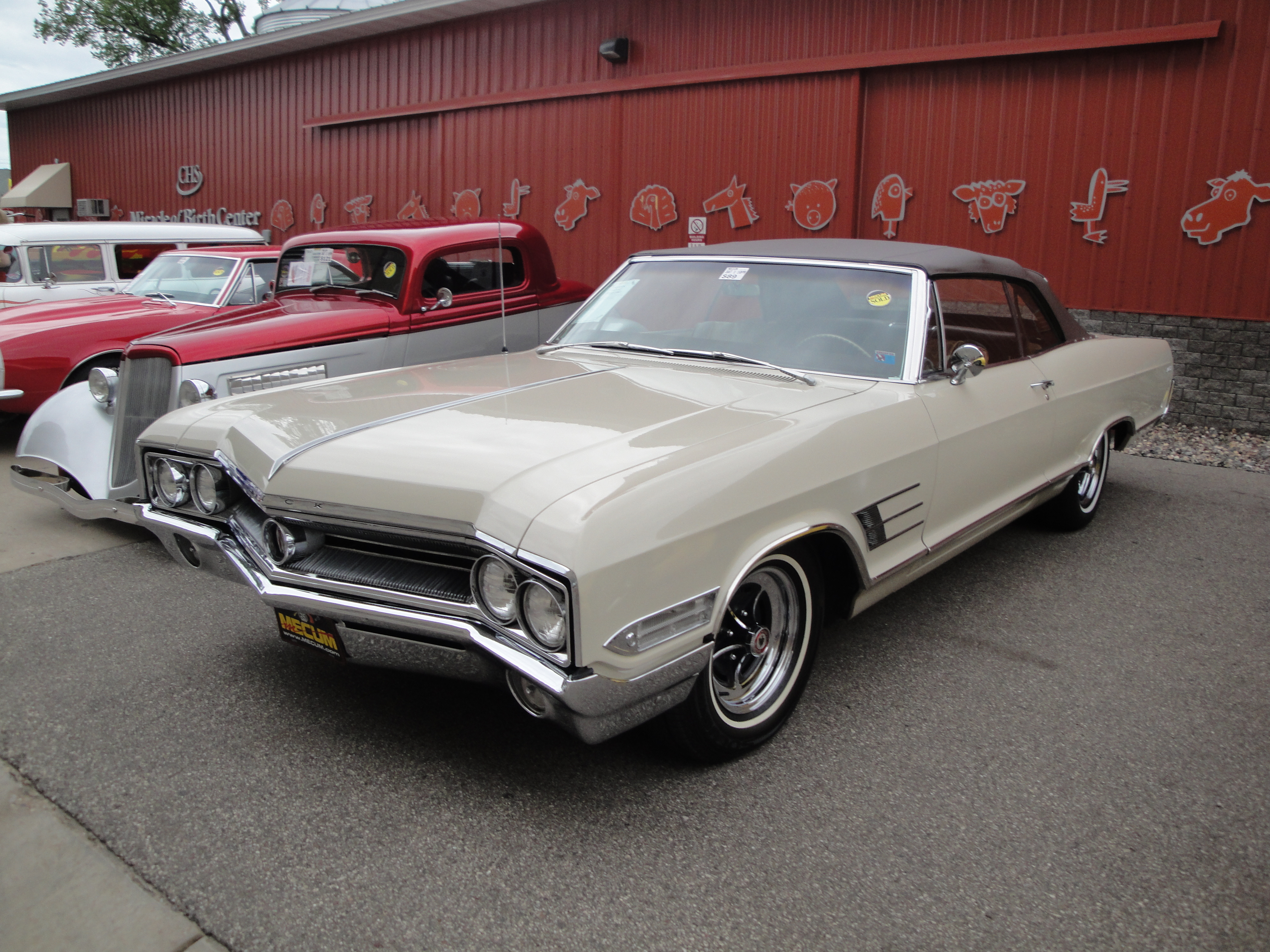
1965 Buick Wildcat 2-door convertible

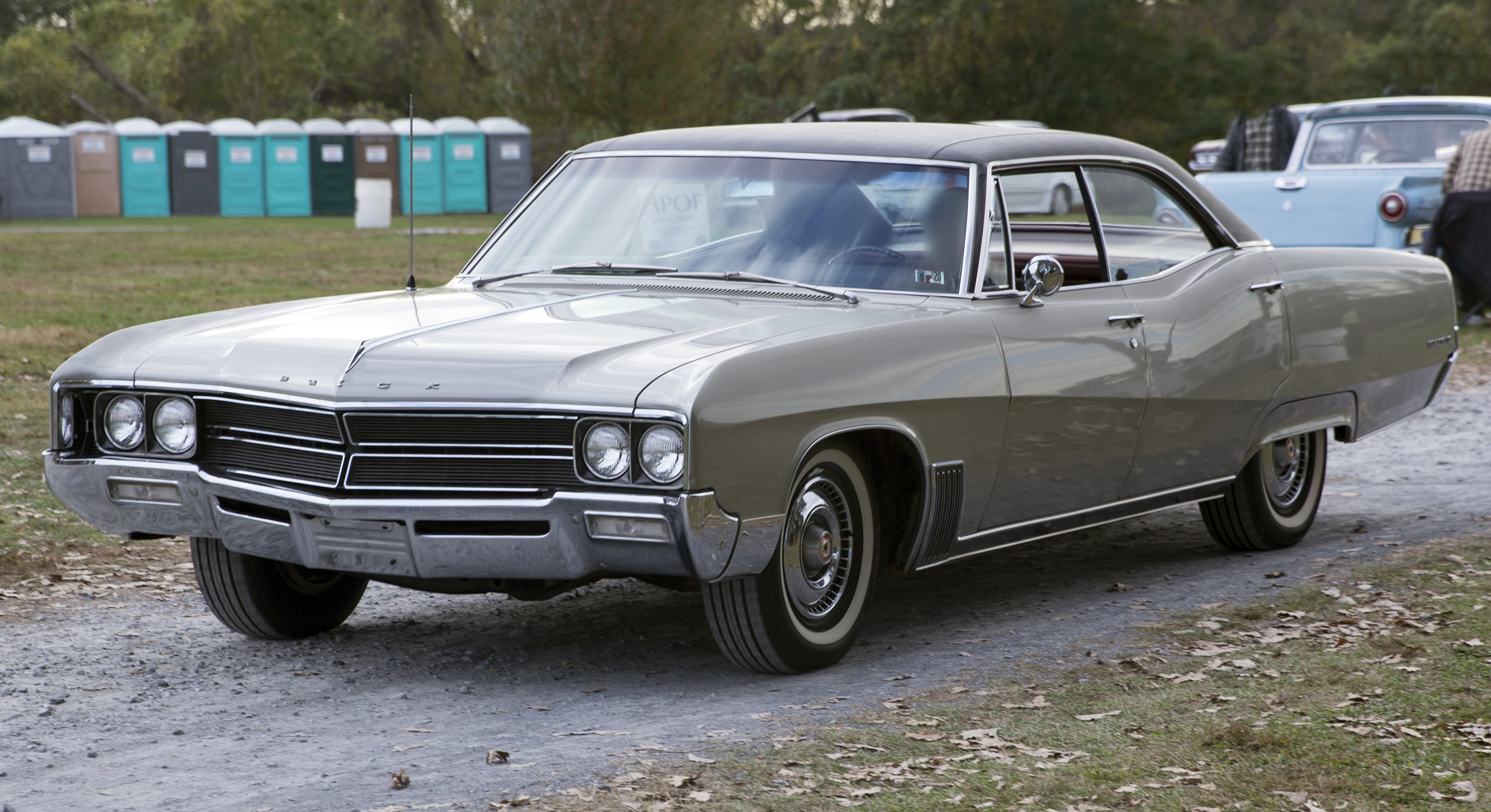
1967 Wildcat 4-door hardtop

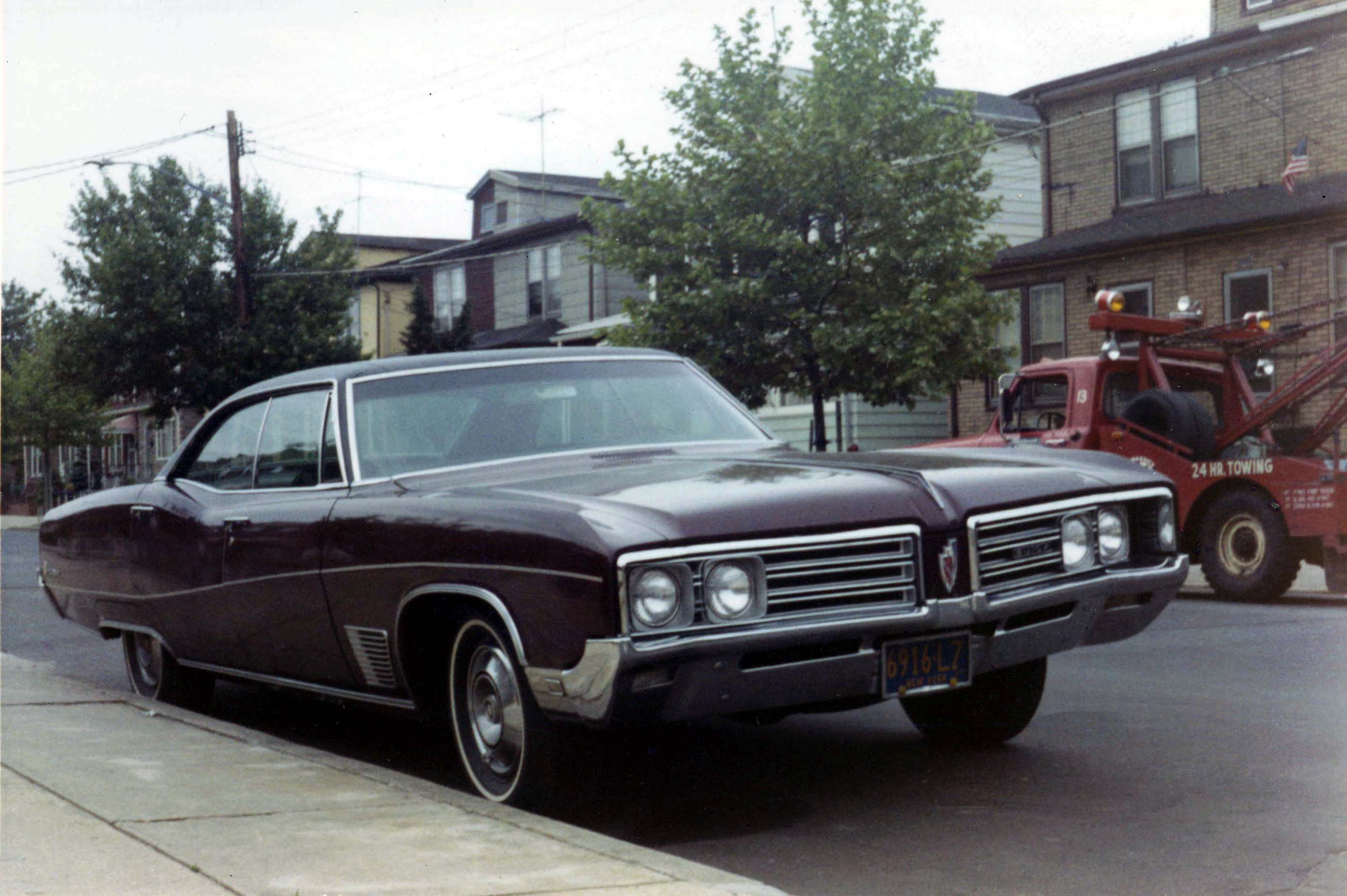
1968 Wildcat Custom 4-door hardtop

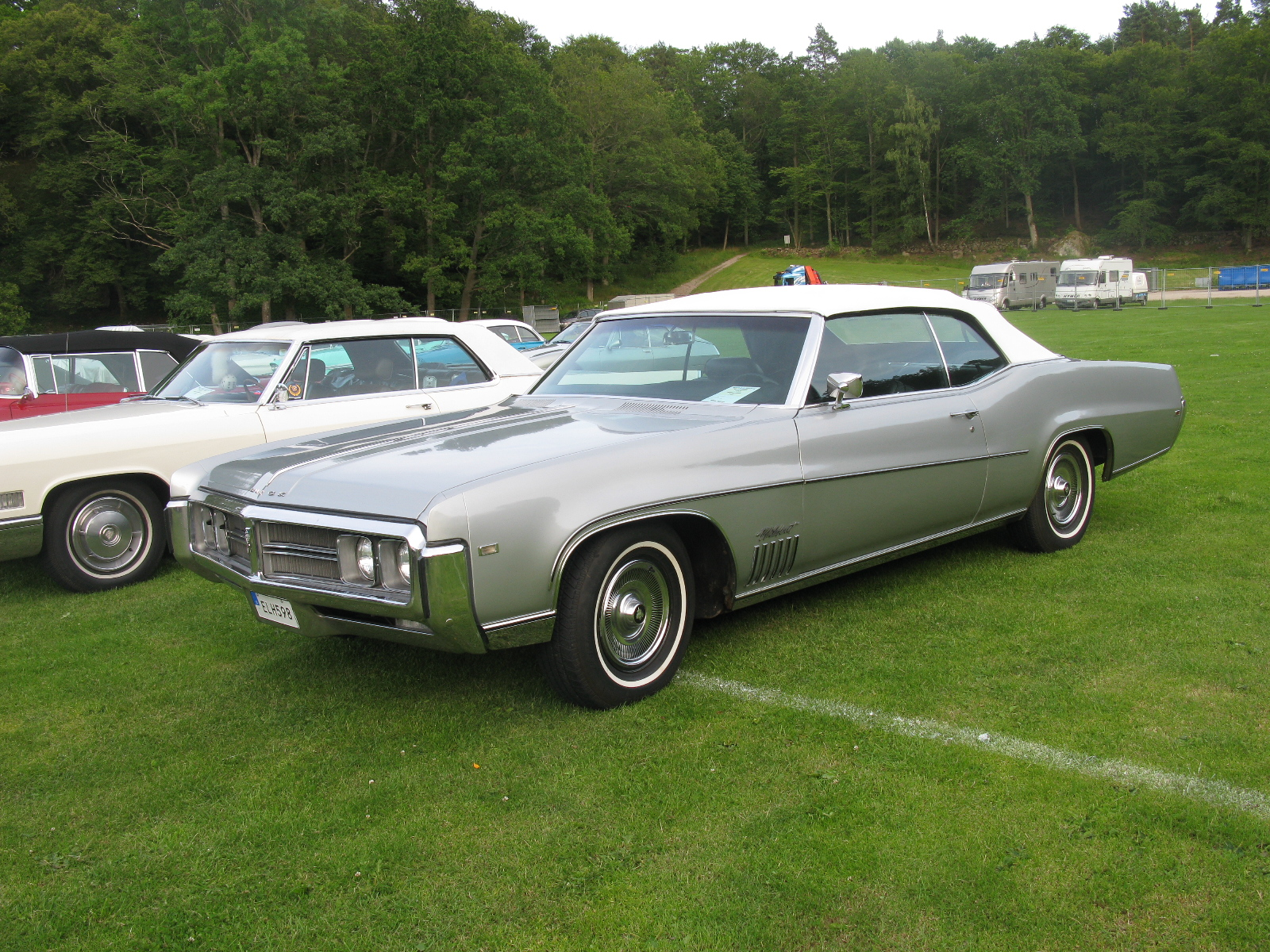
1969 Buick Wildcat Convertible

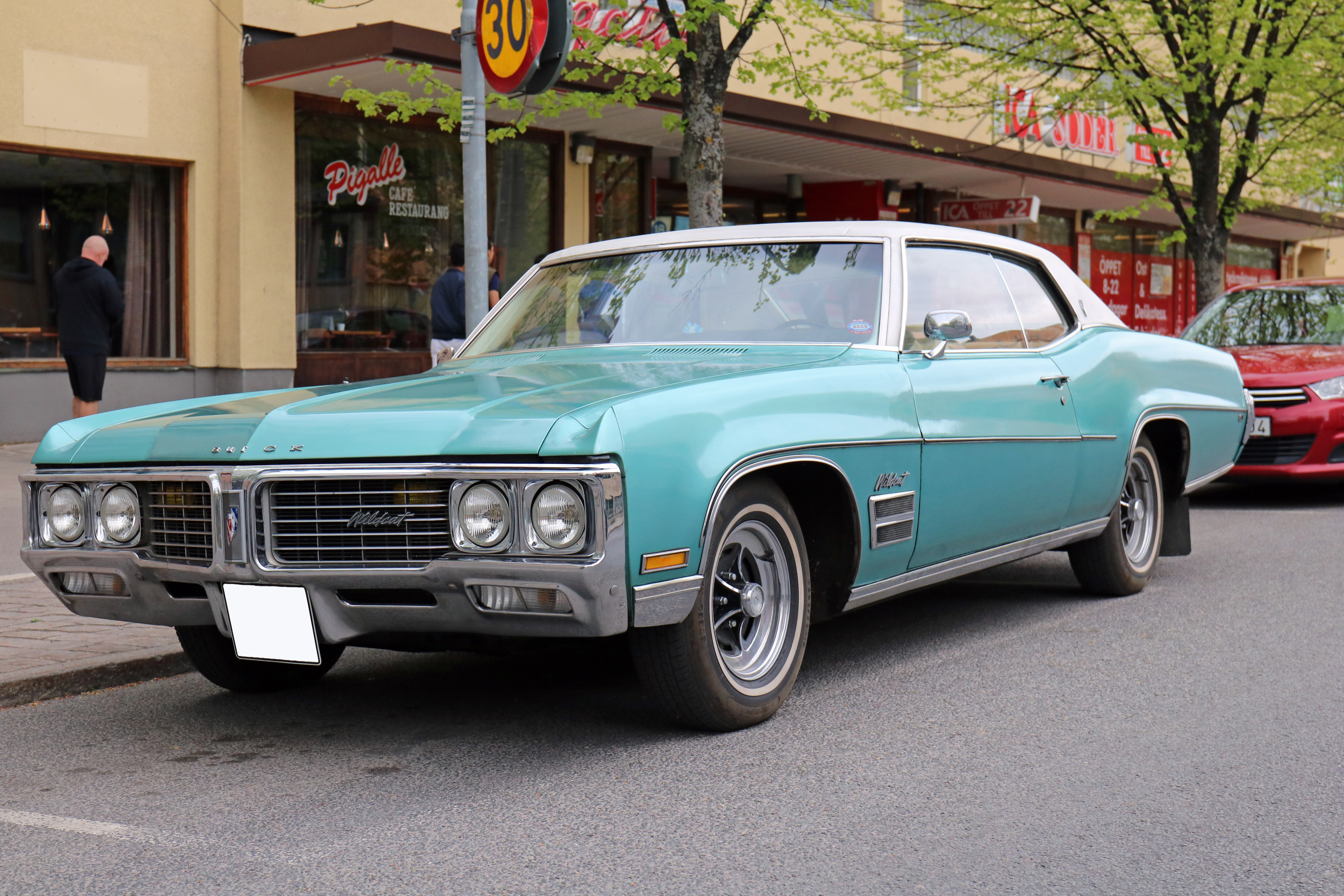
1970 Wildcat Custom 2-door hardtop

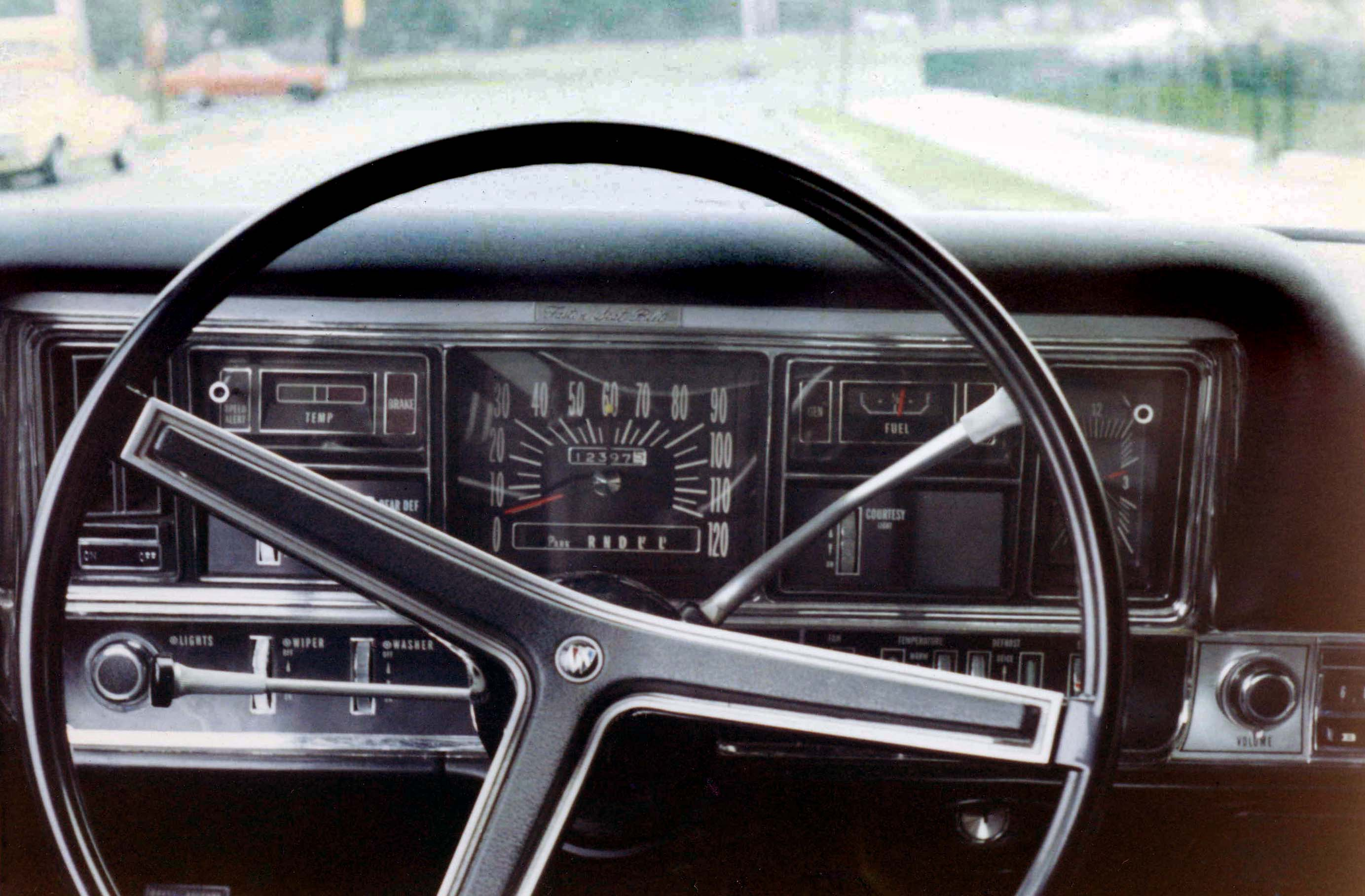
1968 Wildcat Custom dashboard

== Wildcat concept cars and other uses of the name ==
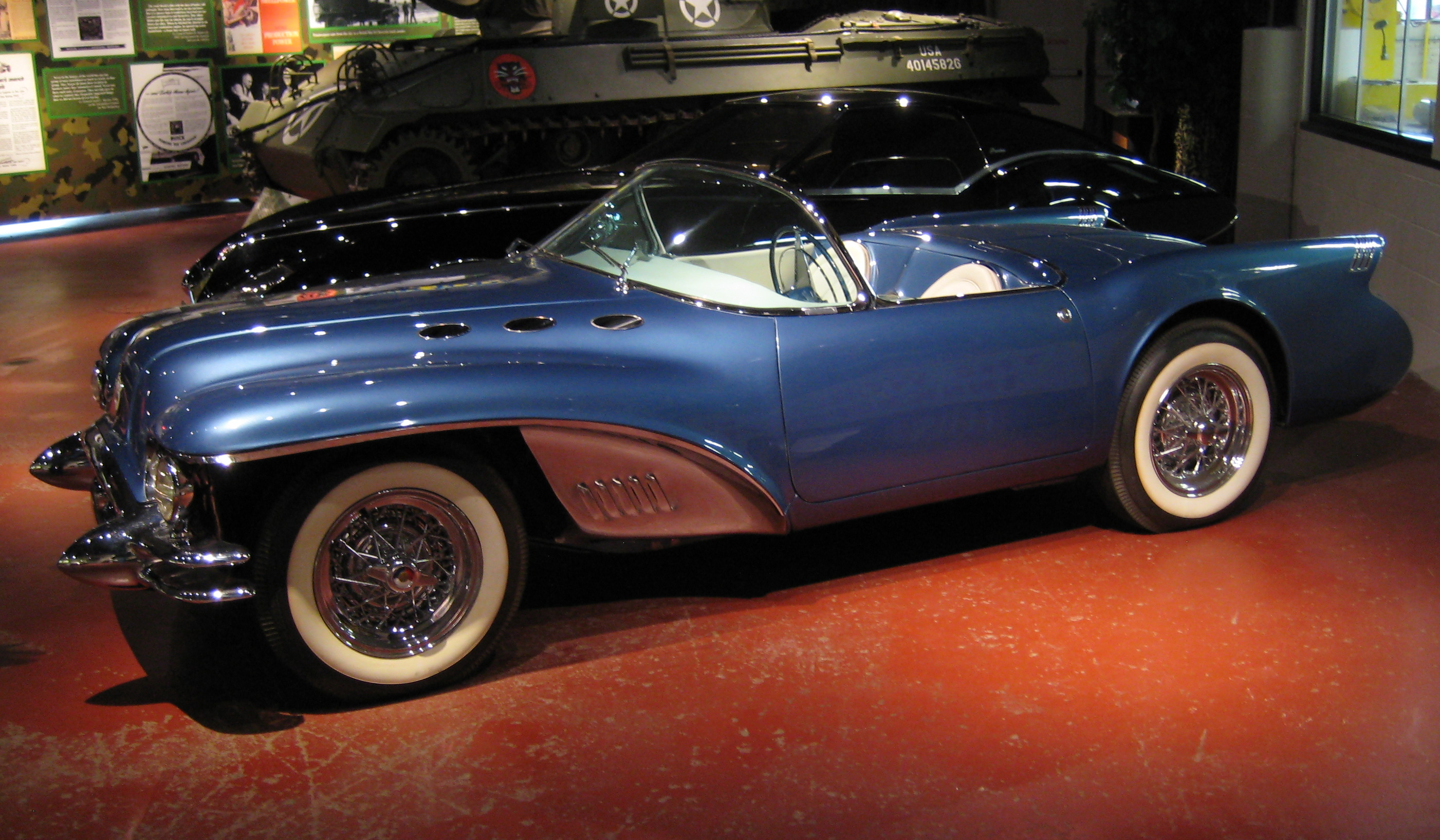
1954 Buick Wildcat II

Buick has used the name "Wildcat" for multiple concept vehicles. During the 1950s, three Wildcats were designed under the guidance of Harley Earl, including the 1953 Wildcat I, 1954 Wildcat II, and 1955 Wildcat III. The Wildcat I and II still exist today.

Buick used the name again in 1985 for a mid-engine sports car with all-wheel drive and a fully-exposed high-performance, double overhead cam V6. The chassis used carbon-fiber and vinyl-ester resin and the body featured a 'lift-up' canopy for entry and exit. The 1985 Wildcat is still owned by Buick today and is still operational.

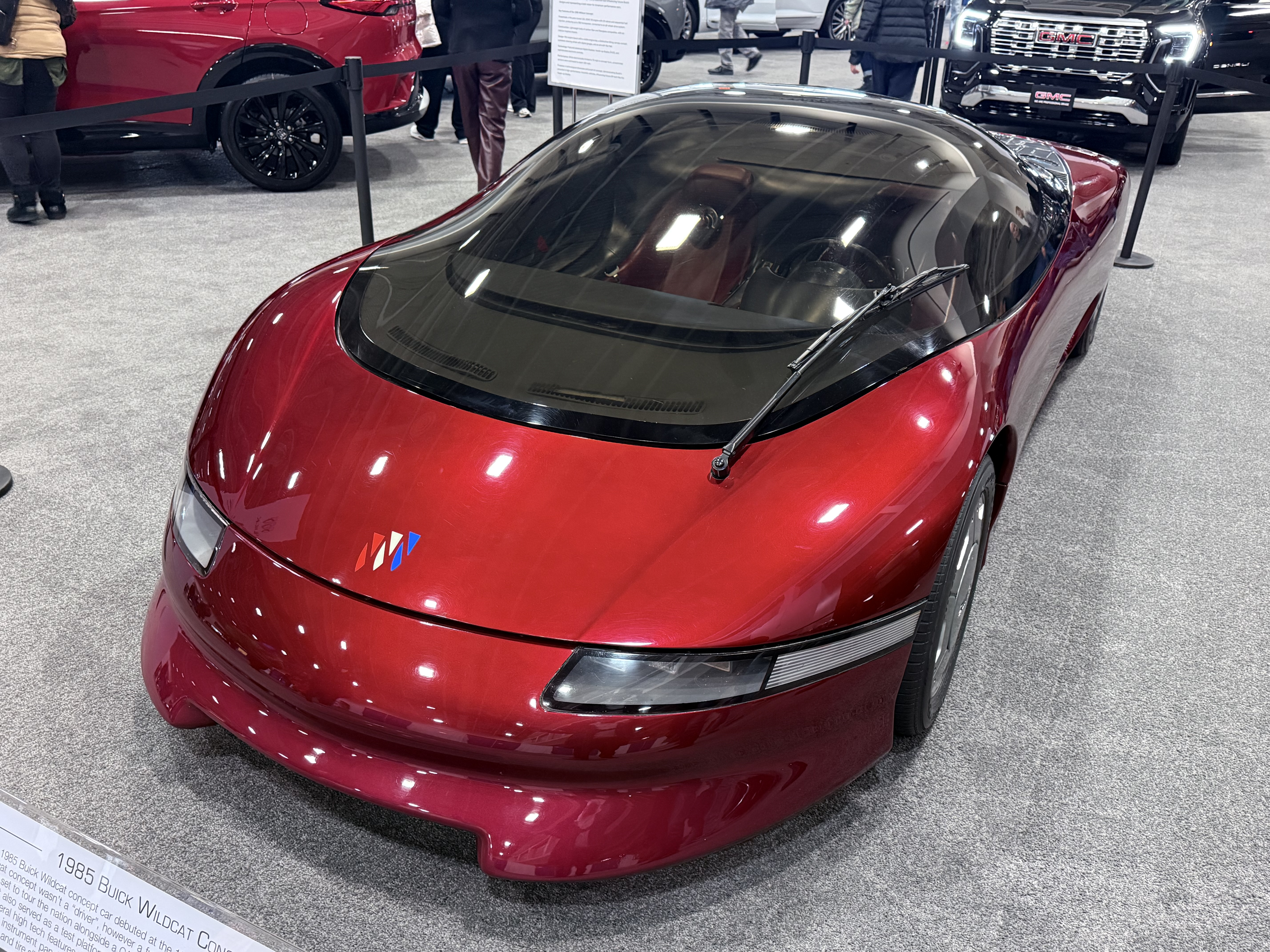
1985 Buick Wildcat Concept

During the seventh generation of the Buick LeSabre, a dealer-installed option named the "Wildcat Edition" was introduced. Made available through Buick dealers, the Wildcat Edition featured a vinyl top, Wildcat logos (on C-pillars and front fender behind the wheel), embroidered leather seat upholstery and fender skirts. The package was based on the Custom package. Little is known about the Wildcat Edition.

In 1997, a Buick Riviera Wildcat was created as a concept car. Derived from the standard Buick Riviera, the Riviera Wildcat featured carbon-fiber interior trim (replacing woodgrain trim) and black chrome; the powertrain was upgraded for increased power.

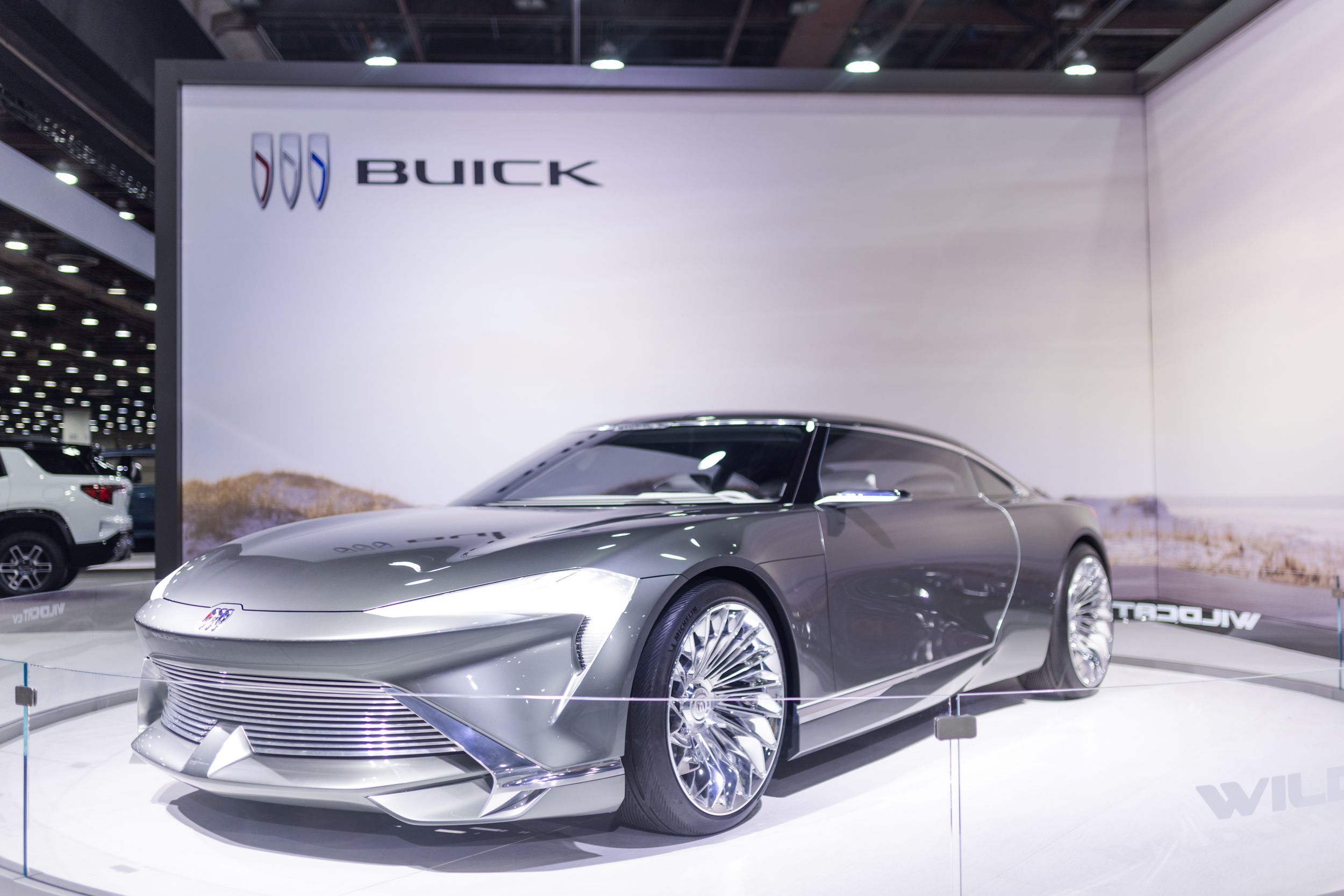
2022 Buick Wildcat EV

On June 1, 2022 the Buick Wildcat EV concept car was revealed in a press release. The concept was an electric vehicle (EV) and was intended as a design study for Buick rather than a proof of concept for a future production vehicle. The intent of this was to create a new design language for Buick to be used as early as 2023, and to reposition the marque in the market to appeal to a younger audience than it had been reaching. This car complimented General Motors' commitment to produce only electric vehicles by 2030. Buick announced in this release that their first production EV is anticipated in 2024. The Wildcat EV concept incorporates a redesigned corporate Trishield emblem, which eliminates the ring and separates the shields from each other. The insides of the shields feature colored "swooshes", retaining the red, white, and blue color scheme of the old logo. It also appears that the new emblem can light up as well, similar to Lincoln's illuminated star emblem.
