= List of Genesis vehicles =

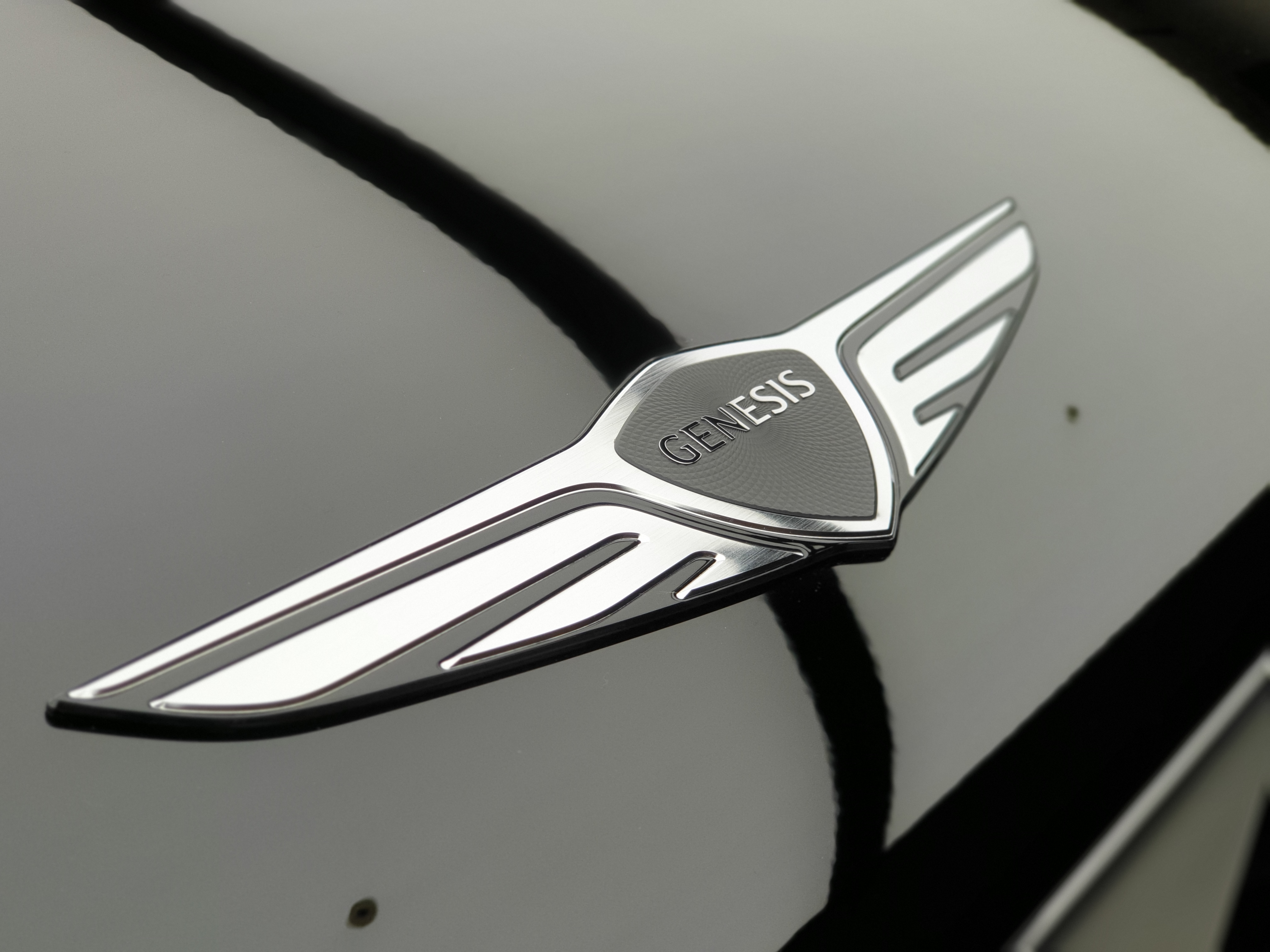
Genesis logo

The following is a list of Genesis vehicles, including past and present production models, as well as concept vehicles and limited editions.

== Production models ==
Model			Current generation		Vehicle description	Global sales (2024, by units)
Image	Name	Introduction (cal. year)	Model code	Introduction	Vehicle description	Global sales (2024, by units)
Sedan/liftback
	G70	2017	IK	2017	D-segment/compact executive sedan.	15,962
	G70 shooting brake	2021	IK	2022	D-segment/ compact executive wagon.	10,245
	G80	2016	RG3	2020	E-segment/mid-size executive sedan, successor to the Hyundai Genesis.	52,277
	Electrified G80	2021	RG3 EV	2021	Battery electric sedan based on the G80.	767
	G90	2015	RS4	2021	F-segment/full-size luxury sedan, successor of the Hyundai Equus. Marketed as the Genesis EQ900 until 2019.	10,111
	G90 LWB	2021	RS4	2021	F-segment/full-size luxury sedan	sales numbers Combined with standard model
SUV/crossover
	GV60	2021	JW	2021	Battery electric crossover based on the Hyundai E-GMP platform.	4,286
	GV70	2020	JK1	2020	Compact luxury crossover SUV	73,564
	Electrified GV70	2022	JK1 EV	2022	Battery electric crossover based on the GV70.	4,153
	GV80	2020	JX1	2020	Mid-size luxury crossover SUV.	68,026
	GV80 Coupe	2023	JX1C	2023	Coupe crossover based on the GV80.	68,026
	GV90	2026	JG1	2026	Battery electric full-size luxury crossover SUV.	

== Concept vehicles ==
Car	Image	Debut	Class	Show	Production
Vision G		2015	Coupe	Pebble Beach	G90
New York		2016	Sedan	New York	G70
GV80		2017	Luxury SUV	New York	GV80
Essentia		2018	Grand tourer (S)	New York	—
Mint		2019	City car	New York	—
X		2021	Coupe/GT	Los Angeles	—
X Speedium Coupe		2022	Coupe/GT	New York	—
X Convertible		2022	Convertible	Los Angeles	—
GV80 Coupe		2023	Luxury Coupe SUV	New York	GV80 Coupe
X Gran Berlinetta		2023	Coupe/GT	Gran Turismo World Final 2023	-
Neolun		2024	Full-size crossover SUV	New York	GV90
GV60 Magma		2024	Performance crossover SUV	New York	GV60 Magma
G80 EV Magma		2024	Sedan	Auto China	-
X Gran Racer		2024	Coupe/GT	Busan	-
X Gran Coupe		2025	Coupe/GT	Seoul	—
X Gran Convertible		2025	Convertible	Seoul	—
X Gran Equator		2025	SUV	New York	—
X Skorpio		2026	Coupe/Off-roader		—
Magma GT3		2026	Sports car	Le Mans	—

== See also ==
- List of Hyundai engines
- List of Hyundai transmissions
- List of Kia vehicles
- List of Hyundai vehicles
- Hyundai Motor Company
- Kia
