= Genesis GV90 =

Battery electric full-size luxury crossover SUV

Overview
- Manufacturer: Genesis Motor (Hyundai)
- Model code: JG1
- Production: November 2026 – present
- Model years: 2027 – present
- Assembly: South Korea: Ulsan Plant 6
- Designer: Under the lead of Luc Donckerwolke

Body and chassis
- Class: Full-size luxury crossover SUV
- Body style: 5-door SUV
- Layout: Dual-motor, all-wheel-drive
- Platform: Electric Mobility Prime (eMP)
- Doors: Conventional doors (regular); Coach doors (Neolun)

Powertrain
- Electric motor: 2× permanent magnet synchronous motors; 1× 240-kW front and 1× 250-kW rear
- Power output: 490 kW (657 hp; 666 PS)
- Battery: 123.52 kWh (115 kWh usable)
- Electric range: 501 km (311 mi) (EPA) unknown (WLTP)
- Plug-in charging: 350 kW DC

Dimensions
- Wheelbase: 3,245 mm (127.8 in)
- Length: 5,285 mm (208.1 in)
- Width: 2,030 mm (79.9 in)
- Height: 1,815–1,825 mm (71.5–71.9 in)
- Curb weight: 3,030 kg (6,680 lb)

The Genesis GV90 is a battery electric full-size luxury crossover SUV manufactured by Genesis, the luxury brand from the Hyundai Motor Group, since 2026.

It is the fourth SUV model from Genesis and is positioned above the GV80 as the flagship SUV of the luxury brand and as a luxurious alternative to the Kia EV9 and the Hyundai Ioniq 9.

== Development ==
=== Concept ===
The Genesis GV90 was first previewed as a concept at the 2024 New York International Auto Show called the Neolun Concept in early 2024. Three months later, it was showcased at the 2024 Busan International Mobility Show in late June of the same year.

The concept model featured signature two-bar lights, rear-hinged coach doors that eliminate the central B-pillar, reinforced bodywork, and a contemporary dark blue interior. Inside, it features configurable swivel seats and integrated speakers.

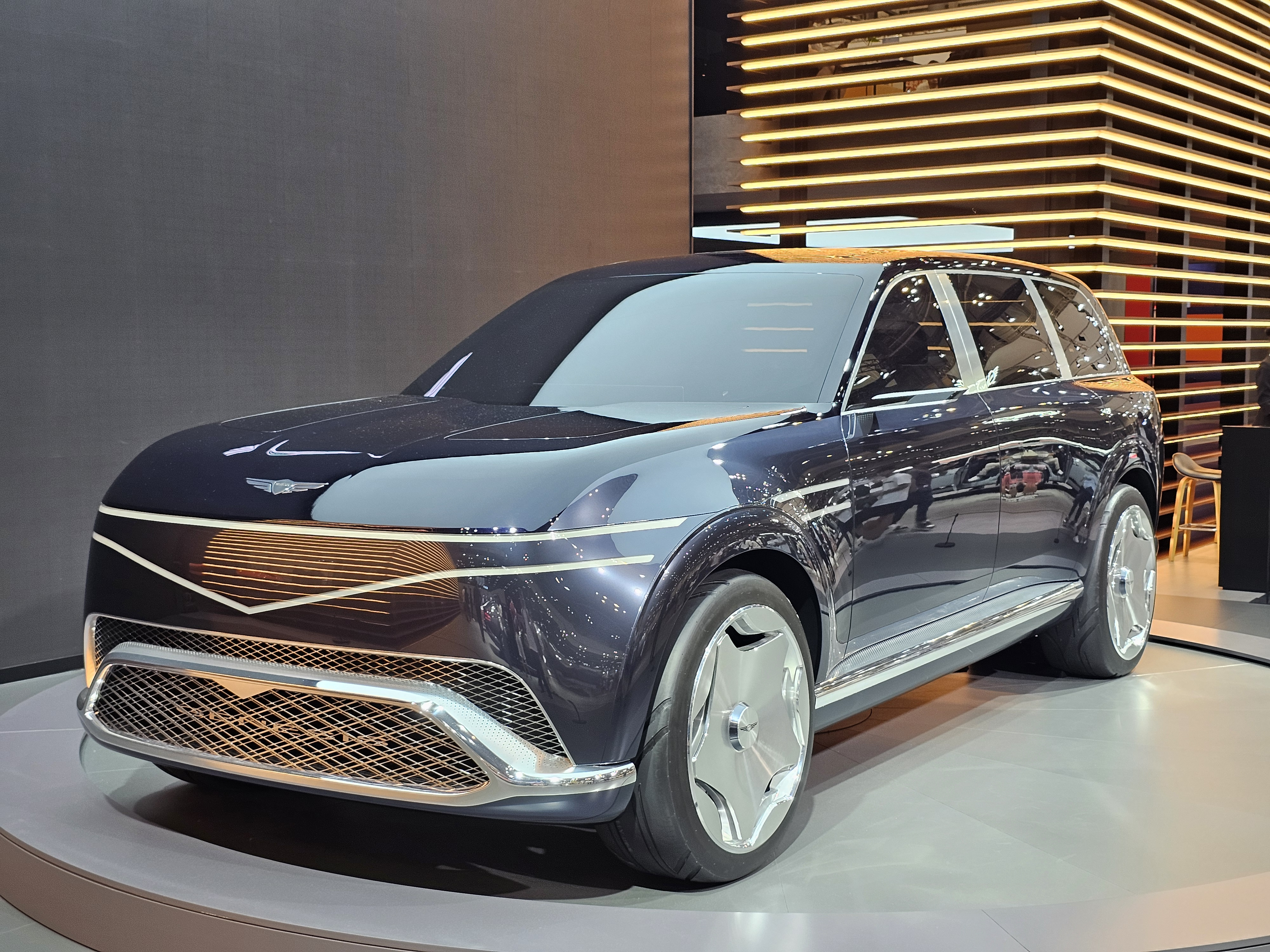
Front view

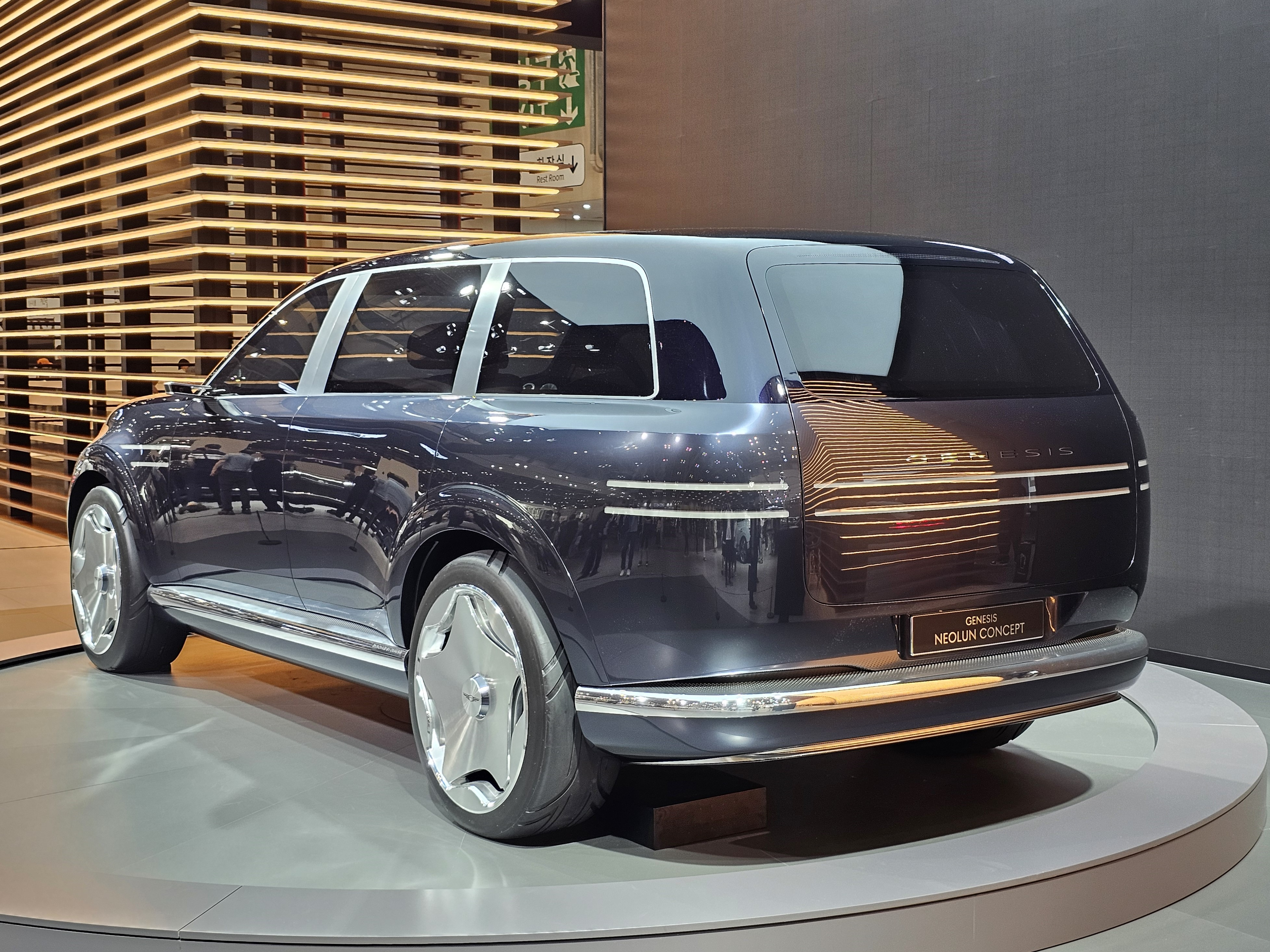
Rear view

=== Production model reveal ===
Two years after the Neolun Concept, on 19 August 2026, Genesis unveiled the production-spec GV90 at a premiere event simultaneously in South Korea and the Palace of Fine Arts in San Francisco, and it stays true to the concept model.

The higher-end variant called the GV90 Neolun was also revealed at the same time alongside the standard version, and it features the coach doors, similar to the Rolls-Royce models.

== Overview ==
=== Design ===
==== Exterior ====
The GV90's exterior has some inspiration from the Korean cultures. According to Genesis, its design was inspired by traditional Korean elements, such as a moon jar, featuring simplified body panels and a clamshell hood. It also uses an updated two-line lighting signature in the front and rear similar to other Genesis models, which use a new technology named the "Wing Face Micro Lens Array" (MLA) integrated into the bodywork using a laser-engraving process. The GV90 is offered with a total of sixteen exterior color options, including gloss and matte finishes.

Side View

Rear View

==== GV90 Neolun ====
The GV90 Neolun is a higher-end variant of the regular GV90. Its body was re-engineered to feature the "Neolun Arch Gate"—rear-hinged coach doors. A sliding dual-motion hinge mechanism first slides the doors outward before letting them open fully, allowing the rear doors to be operated independently of the front doors. Despite the lack of a traditional B-pillar, the GV90 Neolun uses a reinforced body structure with a frame claimed to be 1.5 times thicker than conventional vehicles, high-strength steel beams integrated into all doors, and a concealed roll cage designed to disperse forces.

Front View

Rear View

Interior

Compared to regular GV90 models, the GV90 Neolun is equipped with several upgrades. The exterior features standard body-color and 24-inch forged wheels. The interior features four exclusive upholstery choices, roll-up privacy shades, the option of a veneer wood floor with radiant heating, as well as exclusive Genesis logos on the crystal sphere controller, headrests, and door sills. Neolun models are offered with a six-seat, three-row configuration.

The First Edition, which initially launches, uses a distinct four-seat configuration known as the "Executive Suite", and features front seats that can swivel 180 degrees to face the rear. It is further equipped with a refrigerator, folding tables for each rear seat, and a comfort partition that further separates the second row from the trunk. It is offered with 3 two-tone exterior color options with matching interior schemes.

Genesis GV90 Neolun First Edition (Vik Black Sonoran Navy Two-tone)

Rear View

Jaipur Rose Seychelles Beige Two-tone

Vik Black Baena Green Two-tone

=== Interior ===
The GV90's interior is offered with five upholstery options, utilizing materials such as leather, wool cashmere, genuine stone, and natural wood. The column-mounted gear shifter is mounted at the 12 o'clock position when resting, but moves to a 2 o'clock position when the doors are closed. It is offered with ambient lighting and a 25-speaker Bang & Olufsen "Premier 3D" sound system, the latter of which has a "Virtual Venue" function that is able to replicate the signature acoustics of several arenas. Acoustic glass in 5 mm (0.20 in) thickness is incorporated for its windows. Furthermore, an additional metal coating atop the windscreen can defrost the glass independently of the in-car climate control. A panoramic roof is optional, equipped with liquid crystal technology that allows its transparency to be adjusted across six zones. Standard GV90 models are offered with either 5, 6 or 7 seat configurations.

It uses a 23.6-inch OLED central widescreen display and a 25-inch head-up display, both operated by Hyundai's Pleos Connect operating system and supported by Android Automotive OS and the Gleo AI voice assistant. When the vehicle is idle, the central display can rise by an additional 90 mm (3.5 in), increasing the display size to 24.6 inches (620 mm).

GV90 Interior

GV90 Neolun Interior

=== Equipment ===
==== Safety ====
The GV90 is equipped with 12 airbags around the interior, including those found in seat cushions and across the panoramic glass roof. Genesis describes the GV90 as the world's first mass-production vehicle to integrate roof-mounted airbags, with the purpose of roller protection; preventing occupants from either impact or being ejected out of the glass roof. An in-cabin monitoring system adjusts airbag and seatbelt operation based on regular usage. In addition, the battery is also equipped with a thermal runaway protection system that minimizes heat spread across cells, and a cloud-based battery management system that can monitor the battery pack and flag abnormalities.

==== Suspension ====
The GV90 is equipped with standard height adjustable multi-chamber air suspension, electronically controlled adaptive dampers, rear-wheel steering of up to 5 degrees and 4-piston monobloc brake calipers.

=== Platform and specs ===
Unlike the Kia EV9 and Hyundai Ioniq 9, the Genesis GV90 is underpinned by the Electric Mobility Prime (eMP) platform rather than the Hyundai Motor Group's E-GMP platform, which the GV60 uses.

==== Powertrain ====
The GV90 uses a 124 kWh battery pack and a driving range of 311 mi (501 km). A dual-motor setup is used, resulting in a total power output of 657 hp (490 kW) and 590 lb⋅ft (800 N⋅m) of torque. Each motor is equipped with its own limited-slip differential to optimize power delivery across a wide range of operating conditions.

==== Architecture ====
Like the Kia EV9 and Hyundai Ioniq 9, despite being underpinned by a different platform, the Genesis GV90 rides on an 800-volt architecture, charging from 10 percent to 80 percent in 22 minutes using a 350 kW DC fast charger.

== Production and availability ==
The Genesis GV90 and higher-end variant, the GV90 Neolun, are produced at Hyundai's sixth facility plant in Ulsan, South Korea.

Production commenced on 10 November 2026. Also, order bookings for the regular GV90 and GV90 Neolun in its home market of Korea were opened at the same time, and sales in the market were also commenced alongside the vehicle's rollout production.
