= Genesis Mint =

Overview
- Manufacturer: Genesis Motor (Hyundai Motor Company)
- Production: 2019
- Designer: Samir Sadikhov, Sasha Selipanov

Body and chassis
- Body style: 4-door hatchback
- Layout: Rear-motor, RWD
- Doors: Conventional (front); Suicide scissor doors (rear)

The Genesis Mint is a concept car made by Genesis Motor, the luxury subdivision of Hyundai Motor Company. It is a battery electric vehicle with limited range and seating, targeting the market for a luxurious city car. Unlike typical small city cars, it does not feature a rear hatch, instead offering access to its cargo space through scissor doors mounted on each side.

== Design ==
The Mint concept vehicle debuted at Hudson Yards in April 2019, ahead of the New York International Auto Show; it was designed by a worldwide team led by Luc Donckerwolke, the first EV shown by Genesis. The debut event was accompanied by a fashion show featuring designs from Prabal Gurung.

It incorporates several elements of the Genesis corporate design language, including "G-Matrix" (a rhombus/lattice pattern used on the battery floor, wheel spokes, and throughout the interior), quad lamps (both front and rear), the "Crest Grille" (a wide hexagonal shape in front, with a reduced opening reflecting the car's electric powertrain), and "Parabolic Line" profile. Other styling details include a coupe-like profile, large 22 in (560 mm) wheels, and lower air vents around the car. The car's name is derived from its color, which was finished in matte green.

The Mint has a single leather-covered bench seat for the driver and a single passenger; access to the cargo area behind it is through two scissor doors, one on each side of the car, hinged at their rear edges. The seat and dashboard are powered, moving aside to aid entry and exit. The car's main screen is embedded within the steering wheel, and the driving mode selector is a spherical control embedded in the seat's flip-down center armrest; the control rotates to become a switch when the car is on, and becomes a decorative element when the car is off. The door locks and windows are controlled through similar rotating spherical controls in the car's two passenger doors.

Details about the battery electric powertrain were not made public, but Genesis stated the car has a range of 200 mi (320 km) and can charge at rates up to 350 kW. It uses a skateboard-style chassis, with the battery underneath the floor of the car. The charging port is located in the center of the car's rear exterior. Sangyup Lee also claimed the concept was equipped with an advanced driver-assistance system capable of Level 3.5 or 4 automation.

== See also ==
- Aston Martin Cygnet, a similar luxury-targeted city car
- Honda e, an electric city car with limited range
- Mini Electric, an electric city car with limited range
