= Genesis X Gran Berlinetta Vision Gran Turismo =

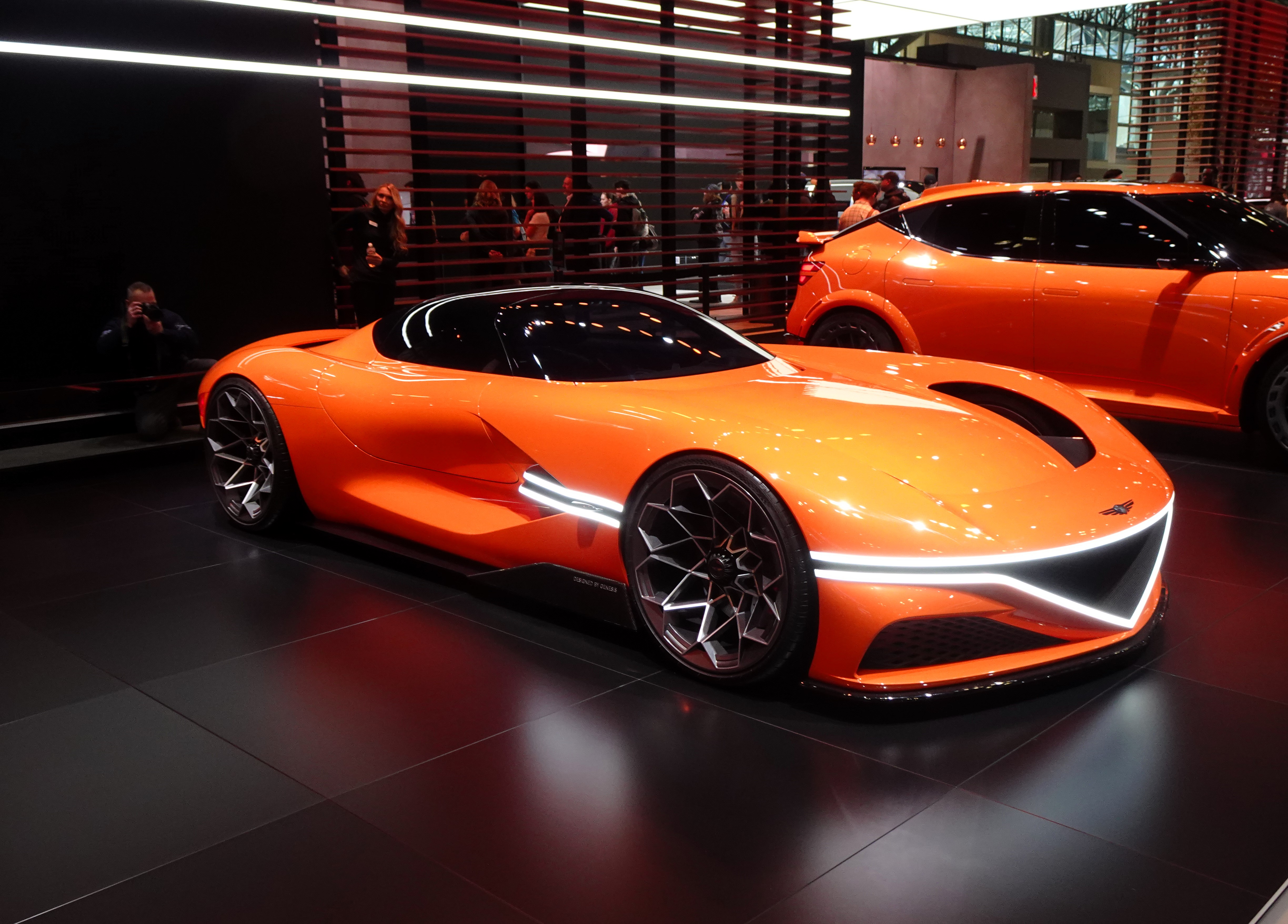

Overview
- Type: Concept car
- Manufacturer: Genesis (Hyundai)
- Production: 2023
- Designer: Tony Chen

Body and chassis
- Body style: 2-door coupe
- Layout: Front-engine, four-wheel-drive

The Genesis X Gran Berlinetta Vision Gran Turismo is a concept car developed by Genesis Motor. It was built under the Vision Gran Turismo project, and is also part of Genesis' Magma program.

== History ==
Genesis teased its Vision Gran Turismo car in 2021 at that year's Monterey Car Week, with three design proposals, named Alpha_DB, Bravo_GB, and Charlie_ET; these were revealed in conjunction with the marque's cars for the Gran Turismo World Series Manufacturers Cup, the Genesis G70 GR4 and the Genesis X GR3. The finalized model, named the Gran Berlinetta and representing the marque's "Athletic Elegance" design language, was revealed at the 2023 Gran Turismo World Series World Finals, and added to the sim in January 2024.

Different views of the car

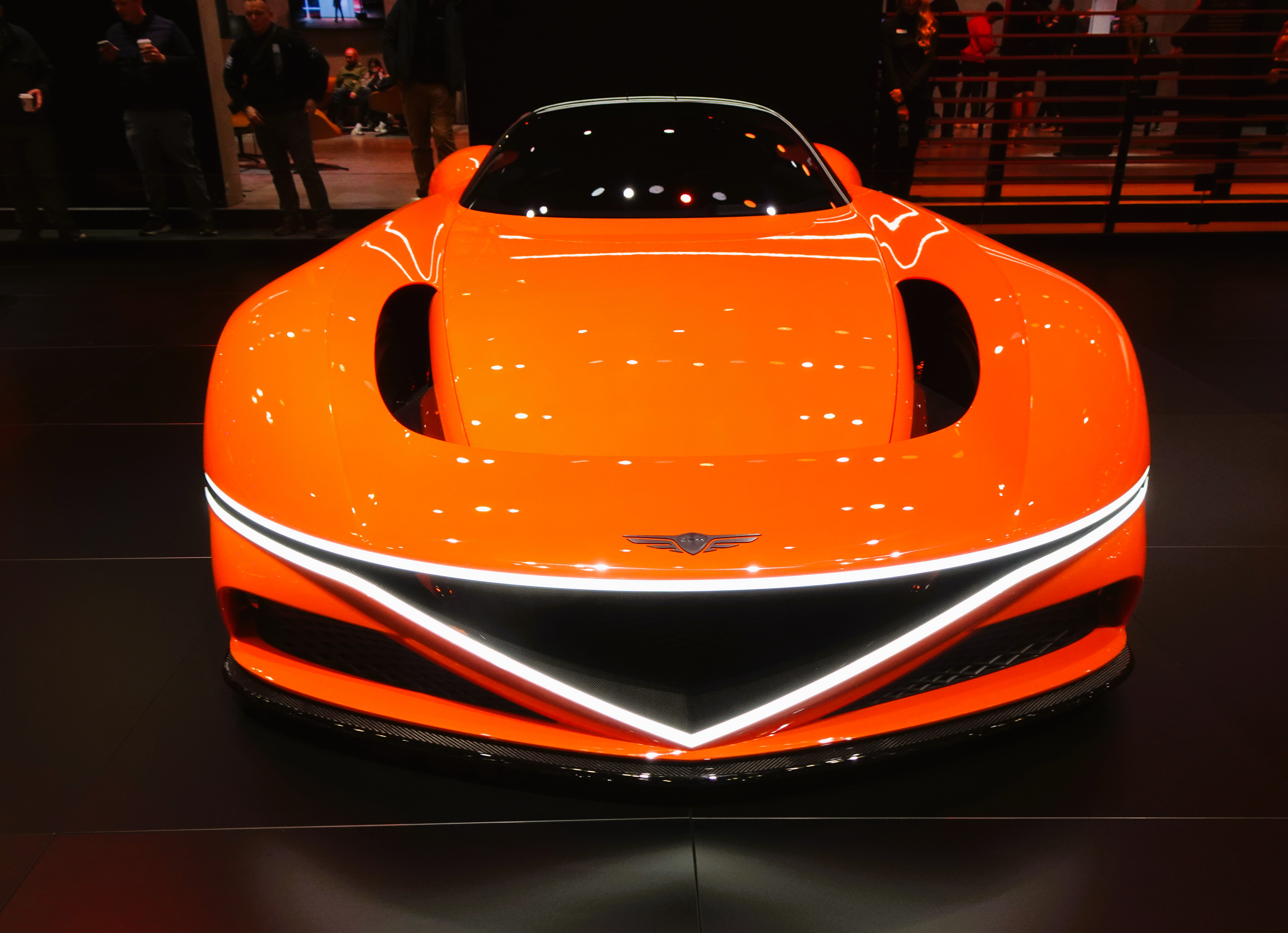
Front side.

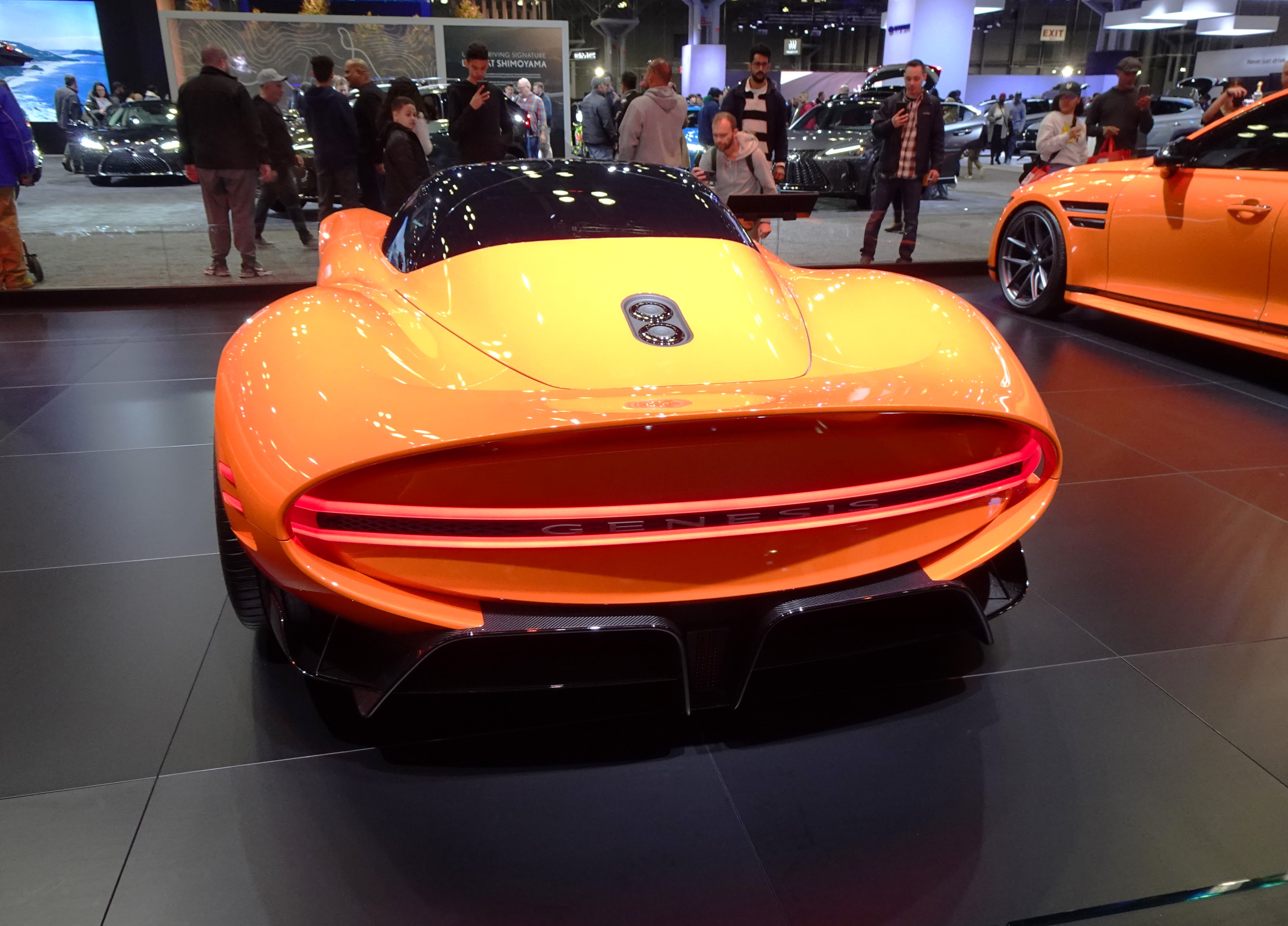
Back side.

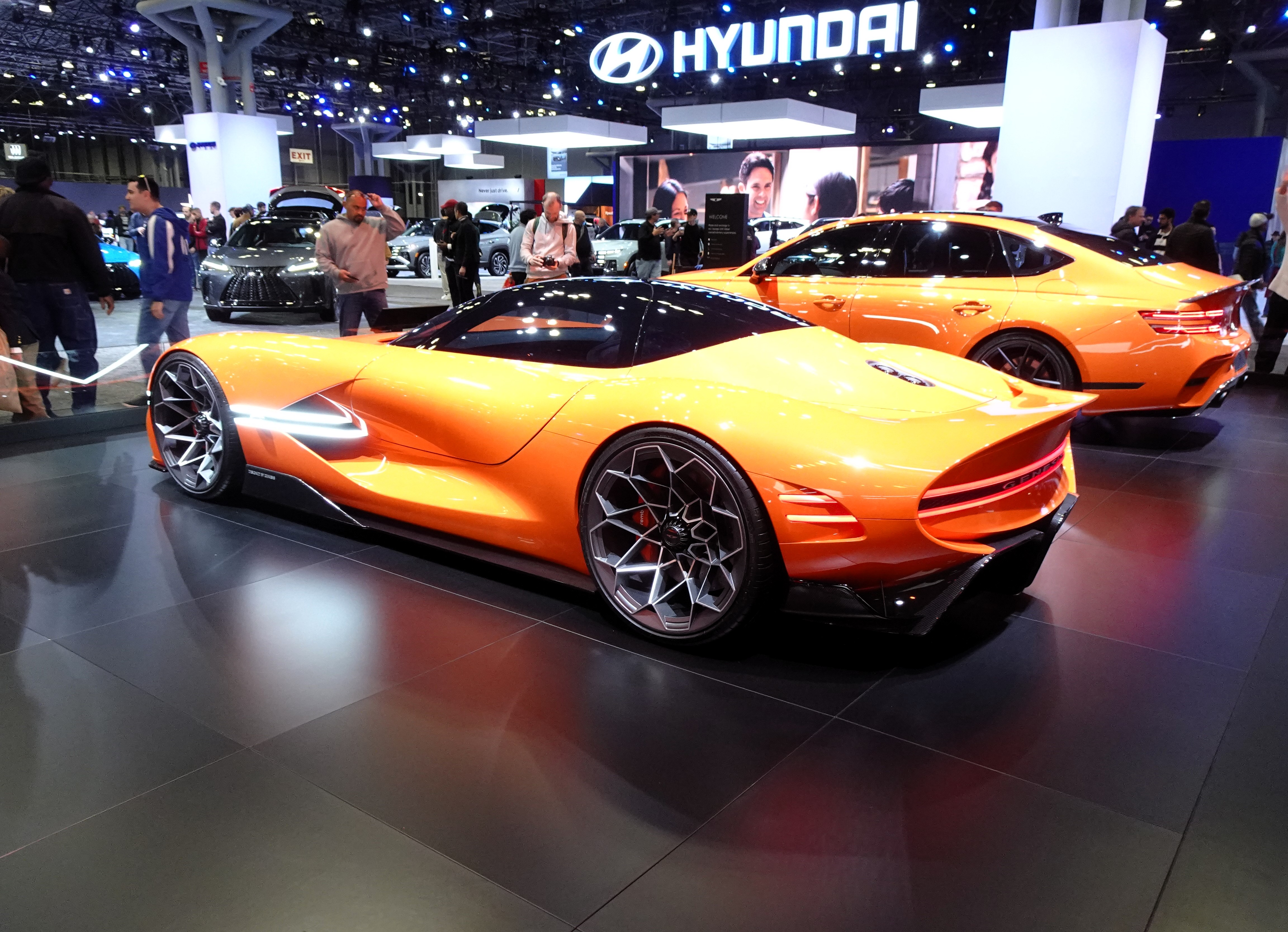
2/4 rear view.

In all its forms optimize its aerodynamics, Genesis announced that the Cx of the X Gran Berlinetta is 0.34. It is one of four premium models in Genesis' Magma program (+1 with the car's variant).

== Specifications ==
The X Gran Berlinetta is powered by a twin-turbocharged 3.3-liter Lambda V6 with electric supercharger technology producing 798 kW (1,070 hp; 1,085 PS), and can reach a top speed of over 400 km/h.

The car's dashboard is very simple: only two circular air vents on a thin dashboard and a futuristic steering wheel make up its cockpit. The car stands out with a large shield-shaped grille and front and rear lights with double lines of LED lights extending to the fenders. It has a large air intake on each front fender.

== X Gran Racer Vision Gran Turismo Concept ==
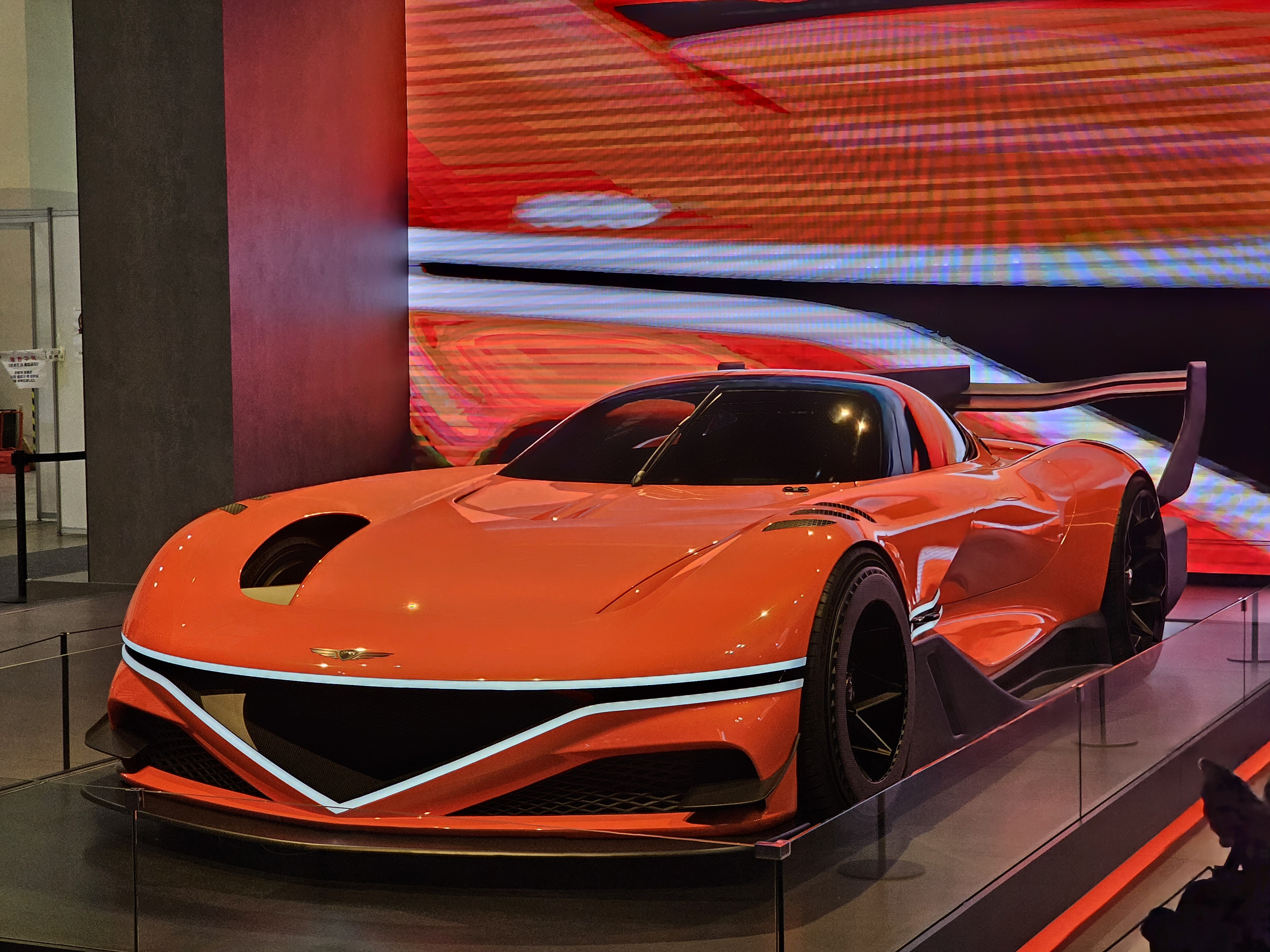
The X Gran Racer at the 2024 Busan Motor Show

The X Gran Racer Vision Gran Turismo Concept is an upgraded version of the X Gran Berlinetta, which is a Group 1 version of the car intended as an endurance prototype. It debuted at the Busan International Mobility Show in South Korea in 2024. It features electronically controlled aerodynamic flaps, large front and rear wings, a front diffuser and a large carbon fiber rear wing, not found on the X Gran Berlinetta. It is powered by an electrically supercharged Lambda II V6 engine developing 1,540 hp (870 hp at 10,000 rpm for the V6 engine and 670 hp for the electric motor).

== See also ==
- Genesis X
- Vision Gran Turismo
- Gran Turismo 7
