= Genesis X Gran Equator =

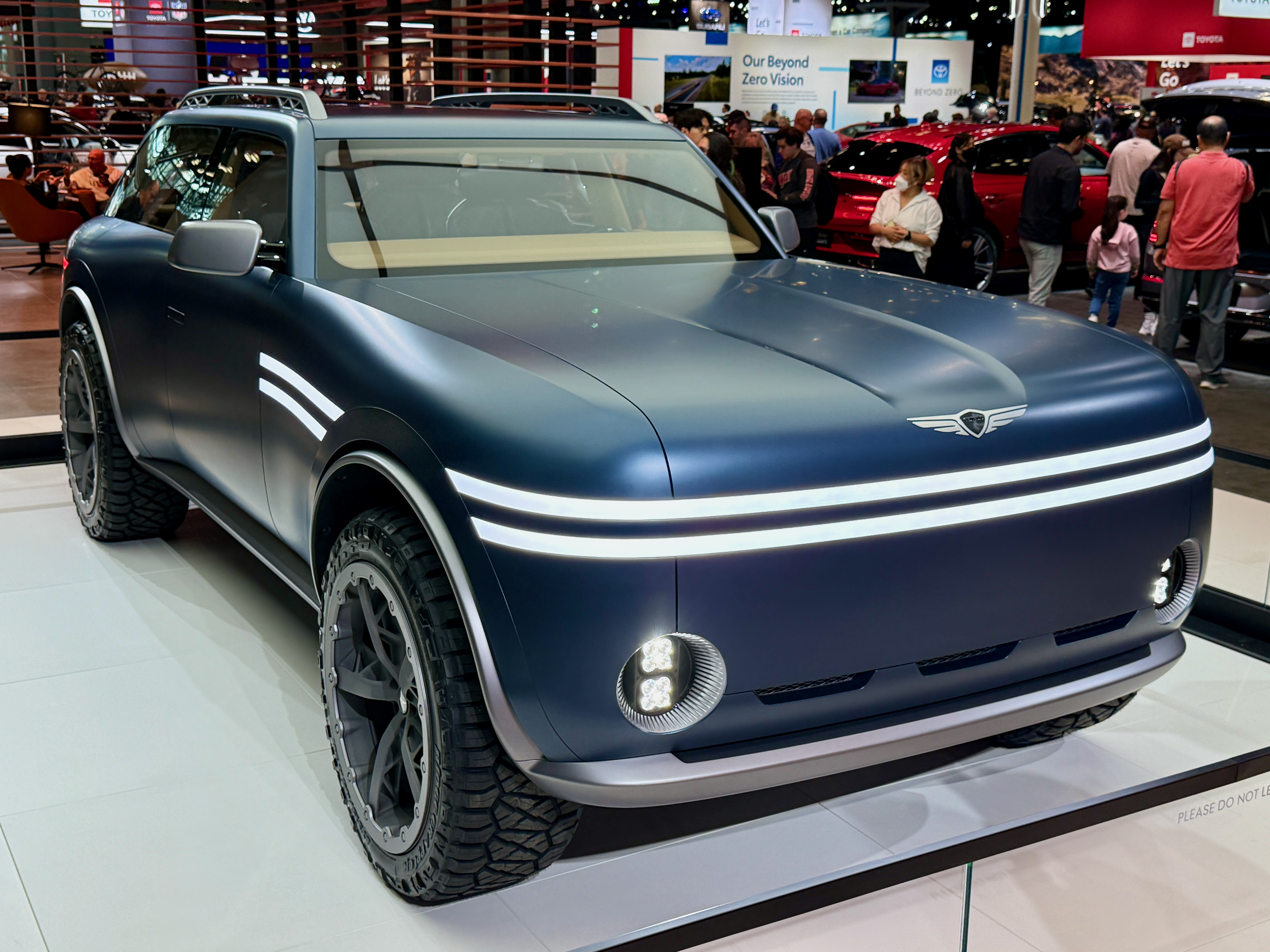

Overview
- Type: Concept car
- Manufacturer: Genesis (Hyundai)
- Designer: Under the lead of Luc Donckerwolke

Body and chassis
- Body style: 5-door SUV

The Genesis X Gran Equator (Korean: 럭셔리 오프로더｜제네시스) is a concept vehicle built by Genesis Motor, the luxury sub-brand of Hyundai Motor Company. It is meant to be a design study with no specific production version announced.

== Overview ==
The Genesis X Gran Equator was unveiled on April 16, 2025 at the 2025 New York International Auto Show. Its name, "Equator", was taken from an Arabian stallion.

It uses a design language described as "athletic elegance", while prominently featuring Genesis' signature two-line motif in the headlights and taillights. Its proportions are somewhat exaggerated through the exceptionally long hood and the steep rear window. Additional details include a grill-less front fascia, 24-inch five-spoke beadlock wheels with all-terrain tires, and it also uses a split tailgate.

Genesis refers to the interior as "lifestyle-oriented". It was presented in a light beige and dark blue color scheme. Large digital displays have been omitted and replaced with significantly smaller circular displays on the dashboard and in front of the driver that resemble analog gauges, while also featuring various physical controls. It also uses a two row four-seat configuration with four separate sunroofs.
