= Genesis New York =

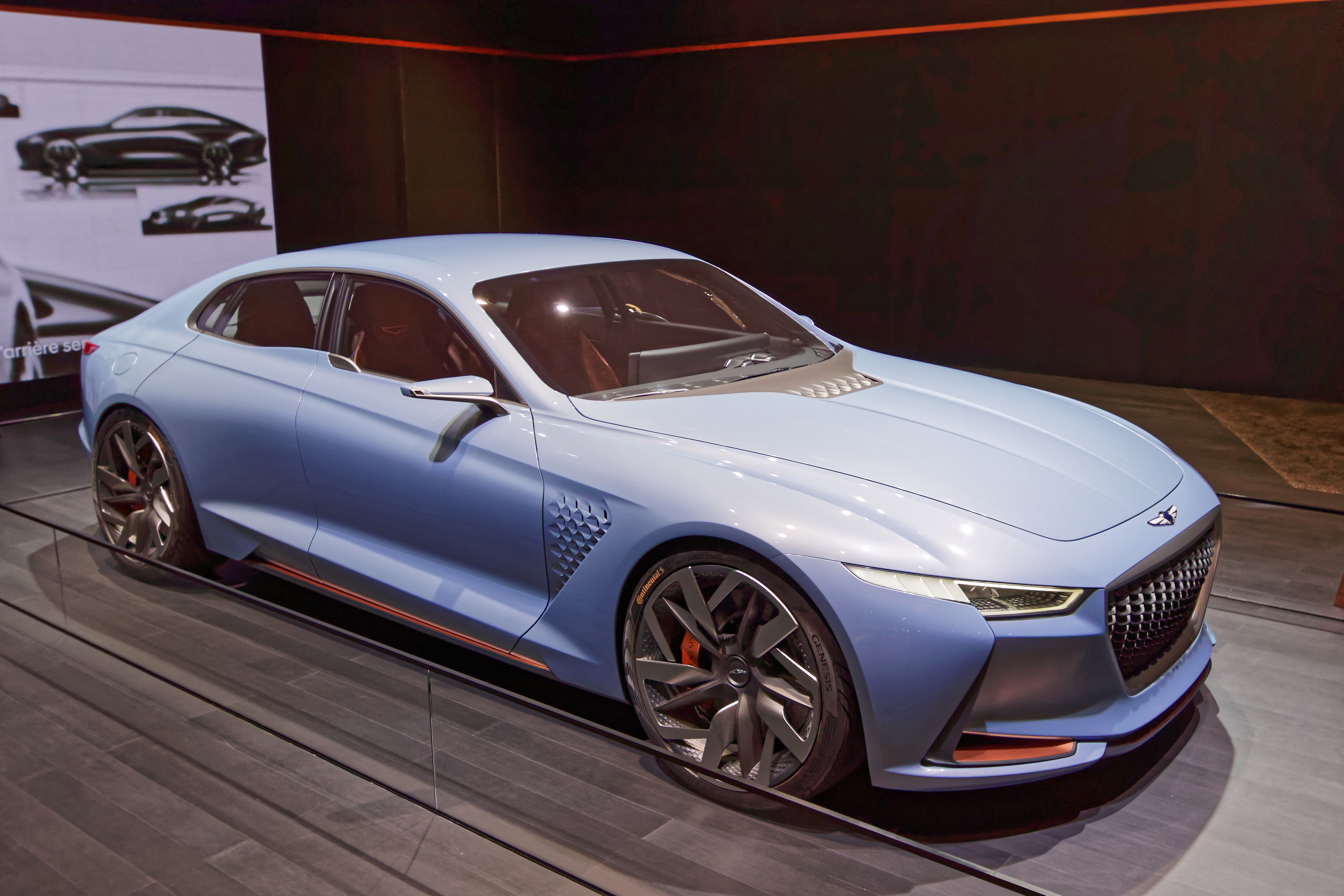

Overview
- Manufacturer: Genesis Motor (Hyundai Motor Company)
- Production: 2016
- Designer: Davide Varenna

Body and chassis
- Body style: Sedan
- Layout: FR
- Doors: 4
- Related: Genesis G70

The Genesis New York is a concept car made by Hyundai Motor Company for its luxury division, Genesis Motor. It debuted at the 2016 New York International Auto Show with a hybrid gasoline-electric drivetrain, previewing the Genesis G70 production automobile.

== Design ==
The New York is equipped with a hybrid gasoline-electric powertrain, using a 2.0L four-cylinder gasoline engine and electric motor for a combined output of 242 hp (180 kW; 245 PS) and 260 lb⋅ft (36 kg⋅m; 350 N⋅m) of torque and an eight-speed automatic transmission. Genesis described the styling as "athletic elegance", with a long hood and performance-oriented silhouette; the exterior design team was led by Luc Donckerwolke.
