= Genesis X =

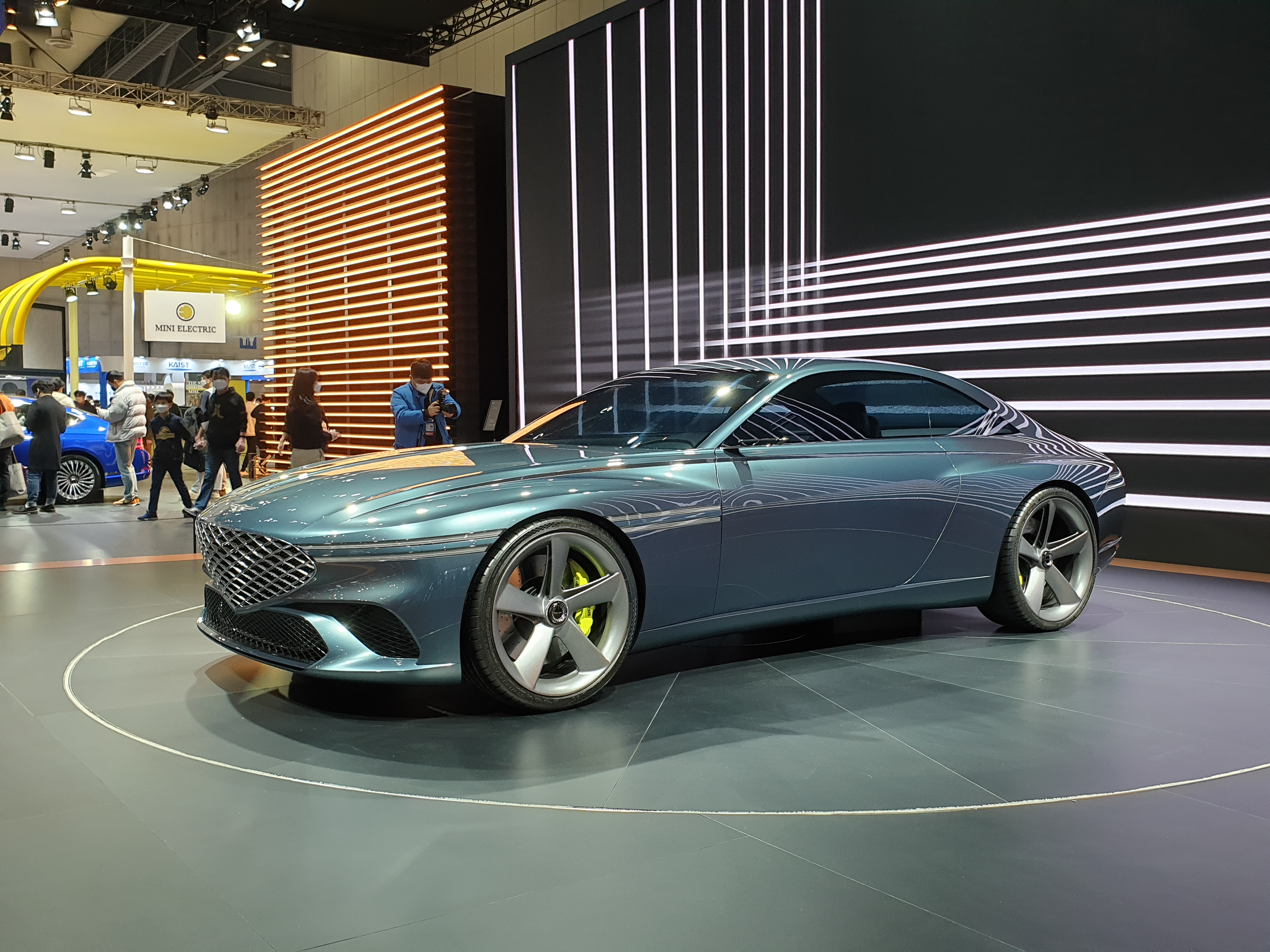

Overview
- Type: Concept car
- Manufacturer: Genesis (Hyundai)
- Designer: SangYup Lee

Body and chassis
- Body style: 2-door 2+2 (4-Seats) coupe
- Layout: Dual-motor, all-wheel drive

Powertrain
- Electric motor: Permanent magnet synchronous reluctance motor

Chronology
- Predecessor: Genesis Essentia

The Genesis X (Korean: 제네시스 엑스) is a concept vehicle built by Genesis Motor, the luxury sub-brand of Hyundai Motor Company. The grand touring coupe is powered by a battery electric drivetrain and was first exhibited in late March 2021. Styling details reflect the marque's "athletic elegance" and "two lines" design language.

== Design ==
The Genesis X was unveiled on March 31, 2021, in Los Angeles, using footage captured on a private rooftop on March 26 at the direction of Jason Bergh. The letter X symbolizes "a hidden hero". Specific details about the car's powertrain were not made available, other than that it used one or more electric traction motors.

The front of the car shows the marque's signature shield-shaped "Crest Grille" with "G-Matrix" pattern and the "Two Lines" motif, embodied in dual thin headlights that extend around the front corners and continue after the front wheel arch. The hood and front fenders are integrated as a single panel-based clamshell hood, which exudes a simple yet sophisticated image. The side profile adheres to the traditional grand touring design, with a long hood and a short rear deck. On the rear, two-line taillights and diffuser give a sophisticated and sensual image. The car's color, Lençóis Blue, is named for and inspired by the seasonal lagoons in Lençóis Maranhenses National Park.

Inside, the concept features a wraparound dashboard and a floating center console. Furthermore, the slim indirect air vents and the side window molding also echo the Two Lines design theme. Interior surfaces use woven scrap leather for the safety belts, steering wheel, and the airbag cover.

The Genesis X Road Show was held on October 16, 2021. It marked the first unveiling of an actual vehicle in South Korea in this format. Genesis X was displayed in a three-dimensional space. The design philosophy was presented through media art using lighting and sound effects.

The Genesis X Speedium Coupe was derived from the Genesis X and revealed in April 2022. It was characterized as a "freestyle design study" led by Donckerwolke.
