= Genesis Essentia =

Korean concept electric sports car

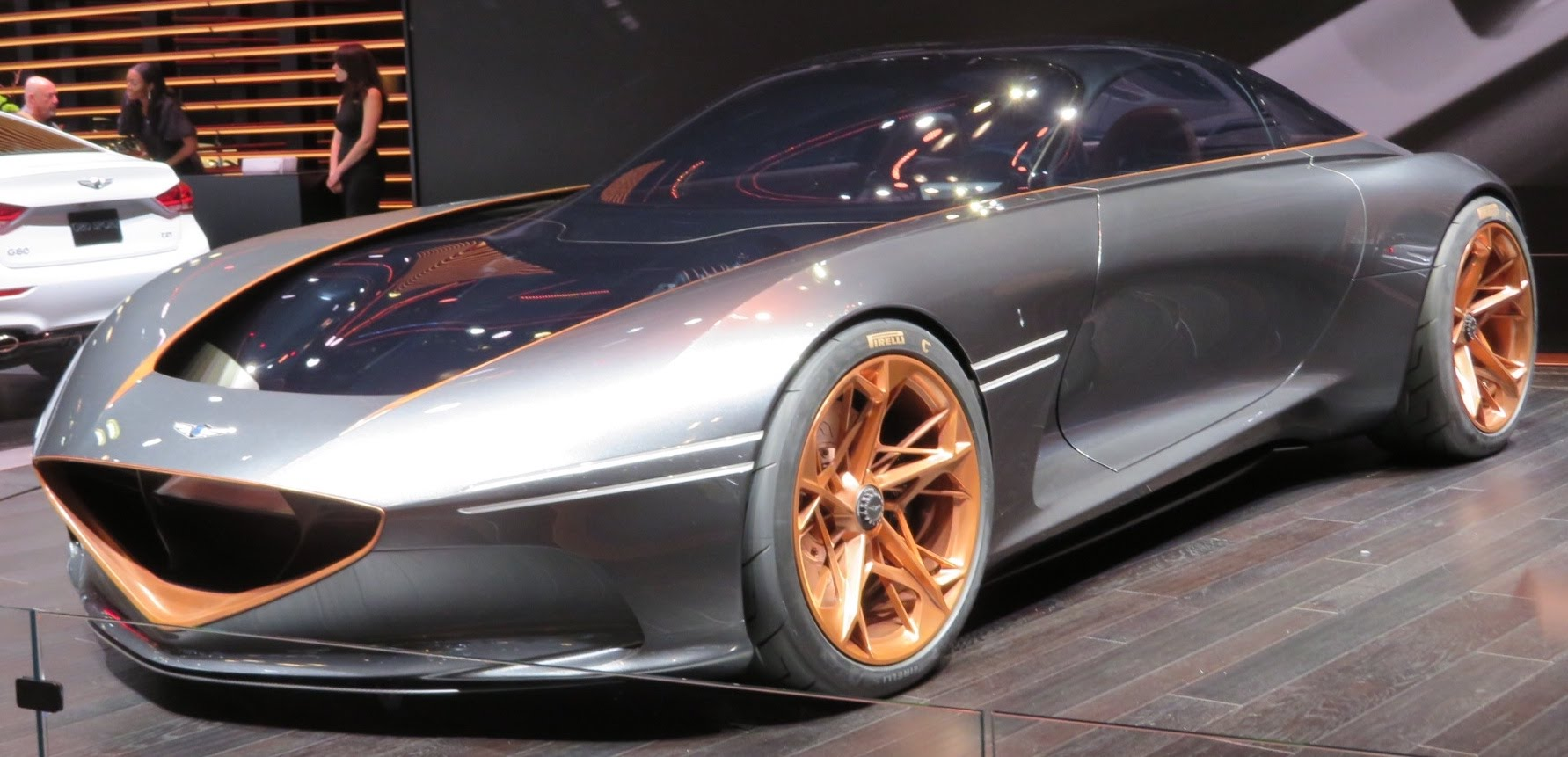
- Front view as seen at the 2018 New York International Auto Show

Overview
- Type: Concept car
- Manufacturer: Genesis (Hyundai)
- Designer: Sasha Selipanov

Body and chassis
- Class: Grand tourer (S)
- Body style: 2-door coupe
- Layout: RWD
- Doors: Butterfly

Powertrain
- Electric motor: "Multiple" electric motors

The Genesis Essentia is a concept sports car that was produced by Genesis, the luxury marque of the Hyundai Motor Group. It was built in 2018 and first displayed at the New York International Auto Show in the same year. Since shortly after its unveiling, there has been speculation regarding the development of a possible production car from this concept affirmed by statements from company officials, though as of May 2020 it is unclear whether the car is in any stage of production.

== History ==
Prior to the 2018 edition of the New York International Auto Show, Genesis announced that it would be presenting another concept at that year's show. In March 2018, the concept was indeed revealed, with the name Essentia. In January of the next year, Automobile Magazine announced it as their 'concept of the year' for 2018, calling it a "...a truly global masterpiece."

Like other Hyundai Motor Group concept vehicles, the Essentia was intended for eventual production. As early as September 2018, there were reports that Genesis executive Manfred Fitzgerald was pushing for the eventual production of the vehicle, albeit with some changes, such as conventional doors. By 2019, a possible arrival year of 2021 was proposed by further clarifications from Fitzgerald.

== Design ==
Like many of its contemporaries in the sports car and supercar markets, the Essentia features a number of performance and luxury features., following the brand's then-new 'athletic elegance' design language. These include a two-tone exterior, carbon fiber monocoque, a low roofline at only 50 inches, butterfly doors, digital connectivity, and others. Much of the car utilizes detailed stylized webbing as a primary texture, which designer Luc Donckerwolke noted was done by 3D printing.

== See also ==
- Electric car
- Hyundai Motor Group
