= Hyundai Vision G =

2015 coupe concept car produced by the Hyundai Motor Company

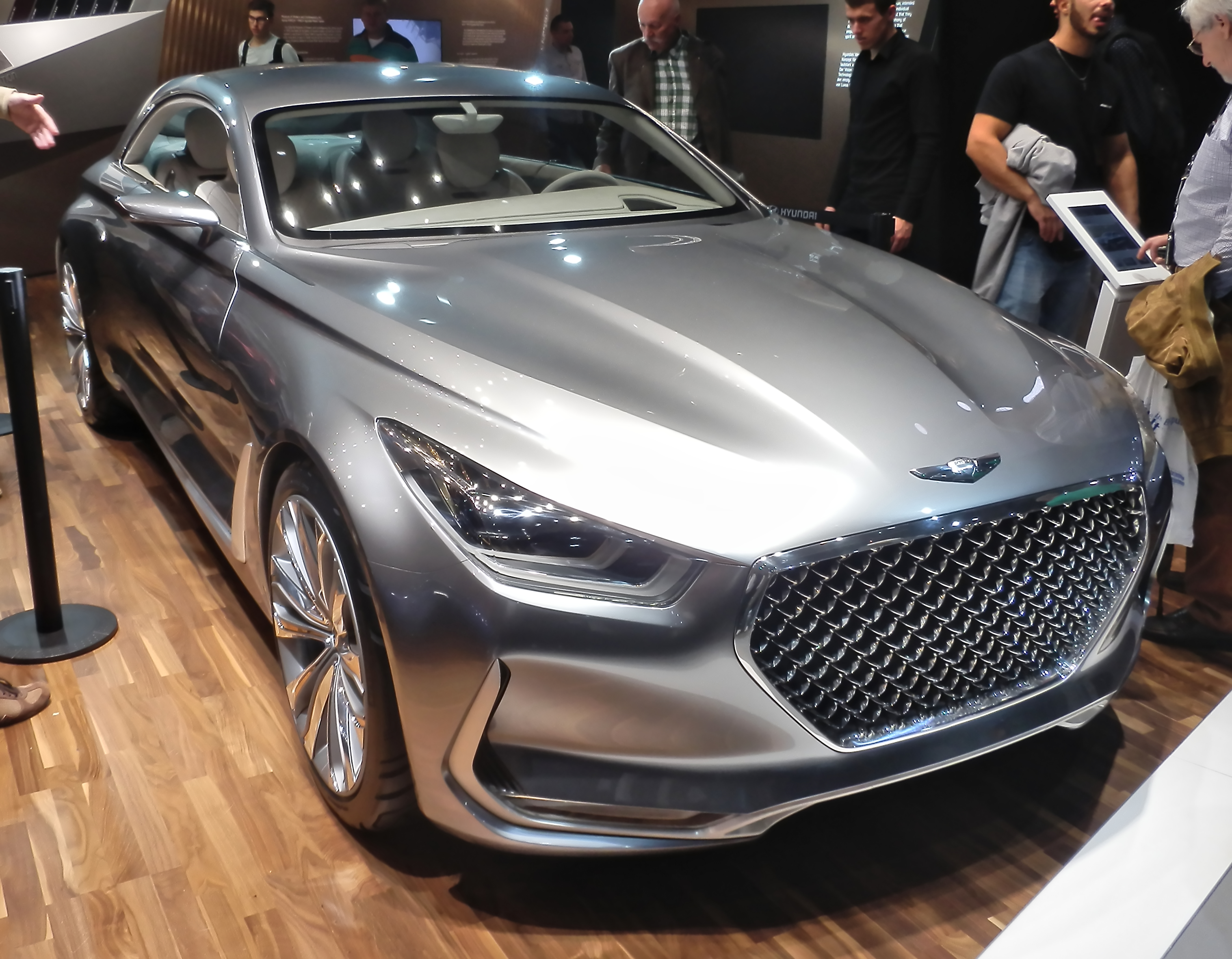
Vision G

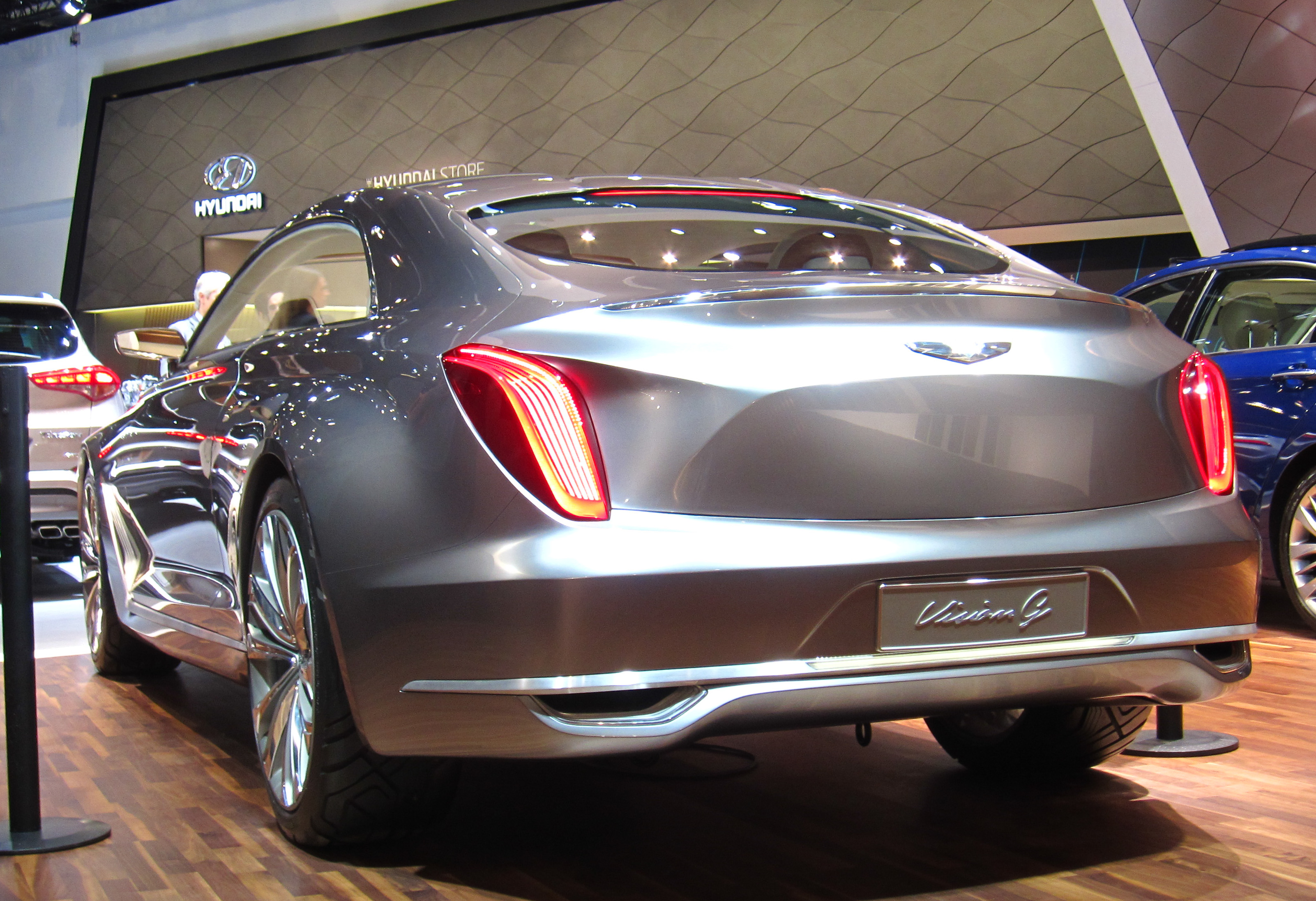
Vision G rear view

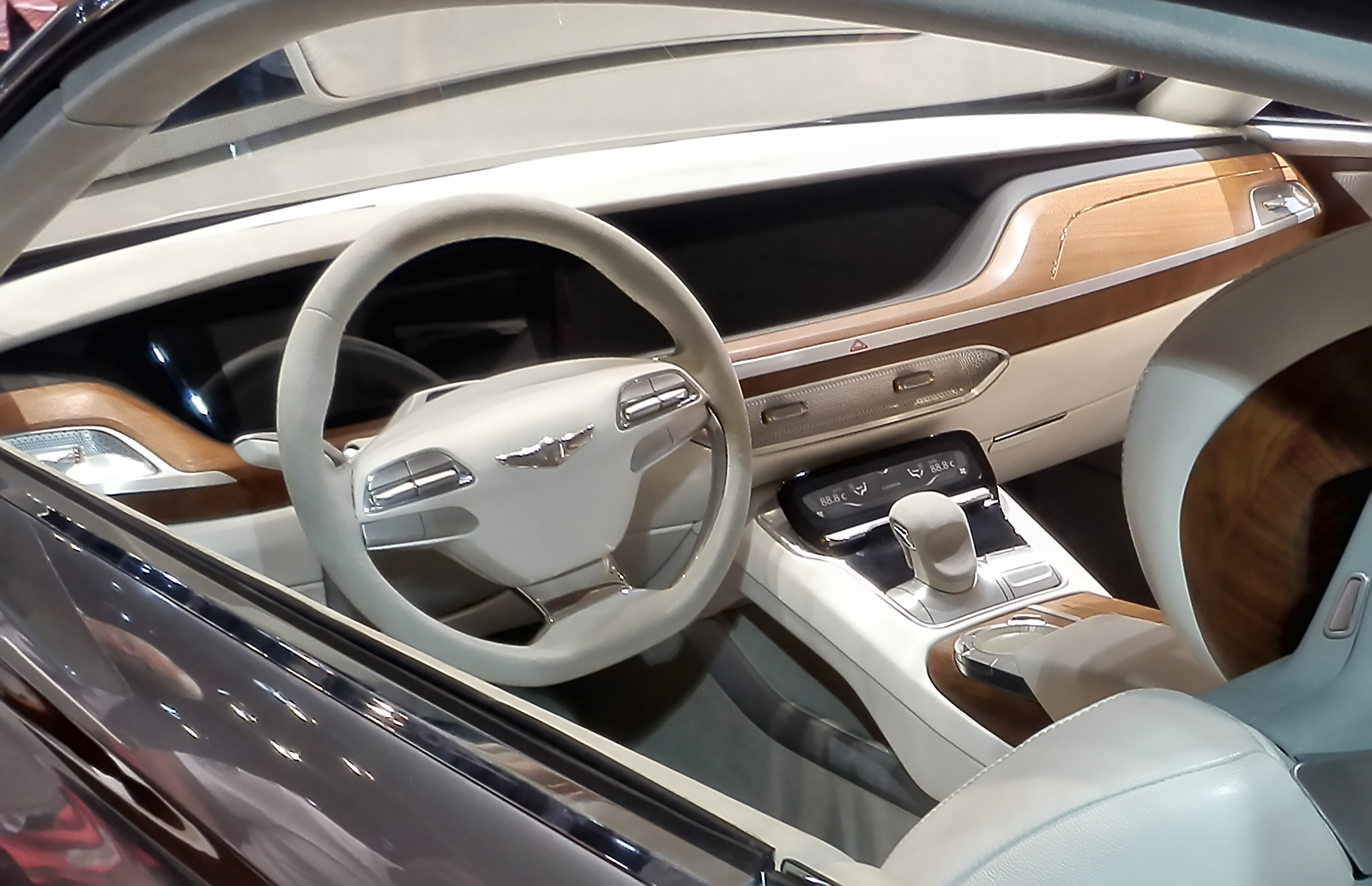
Vision G interior

The Hyundai Vision G Concept is a coupe concept car produced by the Hyundai Motor Company. It made its debut on 2015 Pebble Beach Concours d'Elegance after a showcase in The Los Angeles County Museum of Art on August 12. Designed by Hyundai's multiple global design studios and overseen by Peter Schreyer, the Vision G prominently features Hyundai's signature hexagonal grille and restrained take on fluidic sculpture design language. Powered by a 5.0 V8 Hyundai Tau engine producing 420 hp (313 kW) at 6,000 rpm, it features multiple new improvements such as improved air intake and new upgraded injection mapping.

While the Vision G bears the emblem of Hyundai Genesis, Peter Schreyer, the president of HMC, announced that the car "has nothing to do with the Genesis coupe".
