= Genesis GV80 =

Mid-size luxury crossover SUV

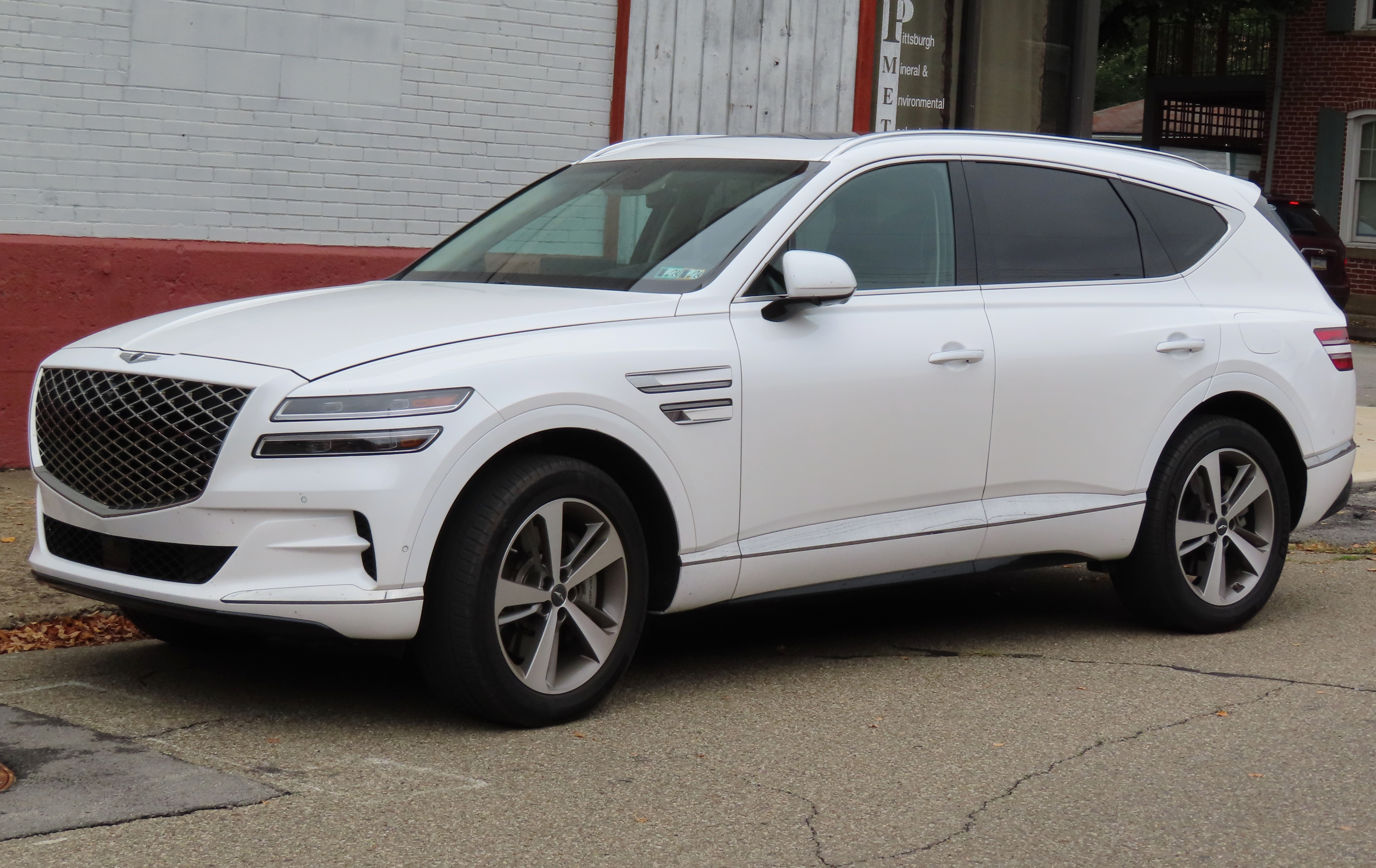
- 2021 GV80 3.5T Advanced (pre-facelift)

Overview
- Manufacturer: Genesis Motor (Hyundai)
- Model code: JX1 (crossover); JX1C (coupe crossover; 2024-present)
- Production: 2020–present
- Model years: 2021–present
- Assembly: South Korea: Ulsan (Ulsan Plant 2)
- Designer: SangYup Lee

Body and chassis
- Class: Mid-size luxury crossover SUV
- Body style: 5-door SUV; 5-door Coupe SUV (GV80 Coupe; 2024-present)
- Layout: Front-engine, rear-wheel-drive; Front-engine, four-wheel-drive
- Platform: Hyundai-Kia M3
- Related: Genesis G80

Powertrain
- Engine: Petrol: 2.5 L Smartstream G2.5 T-GDi I4; 3.5 L Smartstream G3.5 T-GDi V6; 3.5 L Smartstream G3.5 T-GDi e-S/C V6; Diesel: 3.0 L Smartstream D3.0 CRDi I6
- Power output: 304 PS (224 kW; 300 hp) (2.5T); 380 PS (279 kW; 375 hp) (3.5T); 415 PS (305 kW; 409 hp) (3.5T e-S/C); 273–278 PS (201–204 kW; 269–274 hp) (3.0D)
- Transmission: 8-speed automatic

Dimensions
- Wheelbase: 2,955 mm (116.3 in)
- Length: 4,945 mm (194.7 in) (GV80); 4,940 mm (194.5 in) (GV80 facelift); 4,965 mm (195.5 in) (GV80 Coupe)
- Width: 1,975 mm (77.8 in)
- Height: 1,715 mm (67.5 in) (GV80); 1,710 mm (67.3 in) (GV80 Coupe)
- Kerb weight: 2,025–2,205 kg (4,464–4,861 lb) (2.5T); 2,095–2,290 kg (4,619–5,049 lb) (3.5T); 2,135–2,310 kg (4,707–5,093 lb) (3.0D)

The Genesis GV80 (Korean: 제네시스 GV80) is a mid-size luxury crossover SUV manufactured and marketed by Genesis, Hyundai's luxury division, since 2021. It is the first SUV from the Genesis brand.

== Overview ==
Internally codenamed JX1, the vehicle was leaked in 3D in October 2019 and officially unveiled in January 2020 as the first SUV for the Genesis brand. It is a collaborative effort between Genesis design teams in Korea, Europe, and the United States. Built on a new rear-wheel-drive architecture, the doors, hood, and tailgate are made of aluminum.

The GV80 is available with three powertrains, a turbocharged 2.5-litre unit with 304 PS (224 kW; 300 hp), a turbocharged 3.5-litre unit with 380 PS (279 kW; 375 hp), and a turbocharged 3.0-litre diesel with 278 PS (204 kW; 274 hp) horsepower, which will only be available in select markets.

It features a navigation-based smart cruise control (ASCC), remote smart parking assist, an NFC digital key, an around view monitor (AVM), 22-inch wheels, Nappa leather seating, a 14.5-inch touchscreen infotainment display with the 21-speaker Lexicon audio system, electric side curtains, and driver-controlled second- and third-row seating.

The safety system includes ten airbags, forward collision-avoidance assist, reverse parking collision-avoidance assist, driver attention warning, blind-spot collision-avoidance assist, automatic high beam assist, and lane keep assist (LKAS).

Claimed CO_{2} emissions range from 175 to 202 g/km (9.9 to 11.5 oz/mi) (2.5 L petrol), from 199 to 221 g/km (11.3 to 12.5 oz/mi) (3.5 L petrol) and from 164 to 188 g/km (9.3 to 10.7 oz/mi) (3.0 L diesel). The EU target for the CO_{2} emissions of new passenger cars is 95 g/km (5.4 oz/mi) in 2020. Combined fuel consumption ranges from 8.5 to 9.7 km/L (11.8 to 10.3 L/100 km; 24 to 27 mpg_{‑imp}; 20 to 23 mpg_{‑US}) (2.5 L petrol), from 7.8 to 8.6 km/L (12.8 to 11.6 L/100 km; 22 to 24 mpg_{‑imp}; 18 to 20 mpg_{‑US}) (3.5 L petrol), and from 10.4 to 11.8 km/L (9.6 to 8.5 L/100 km; 29 to 33 mpg_{‑imp}; 24 to 28 mpg_{‑US}) (diesel).

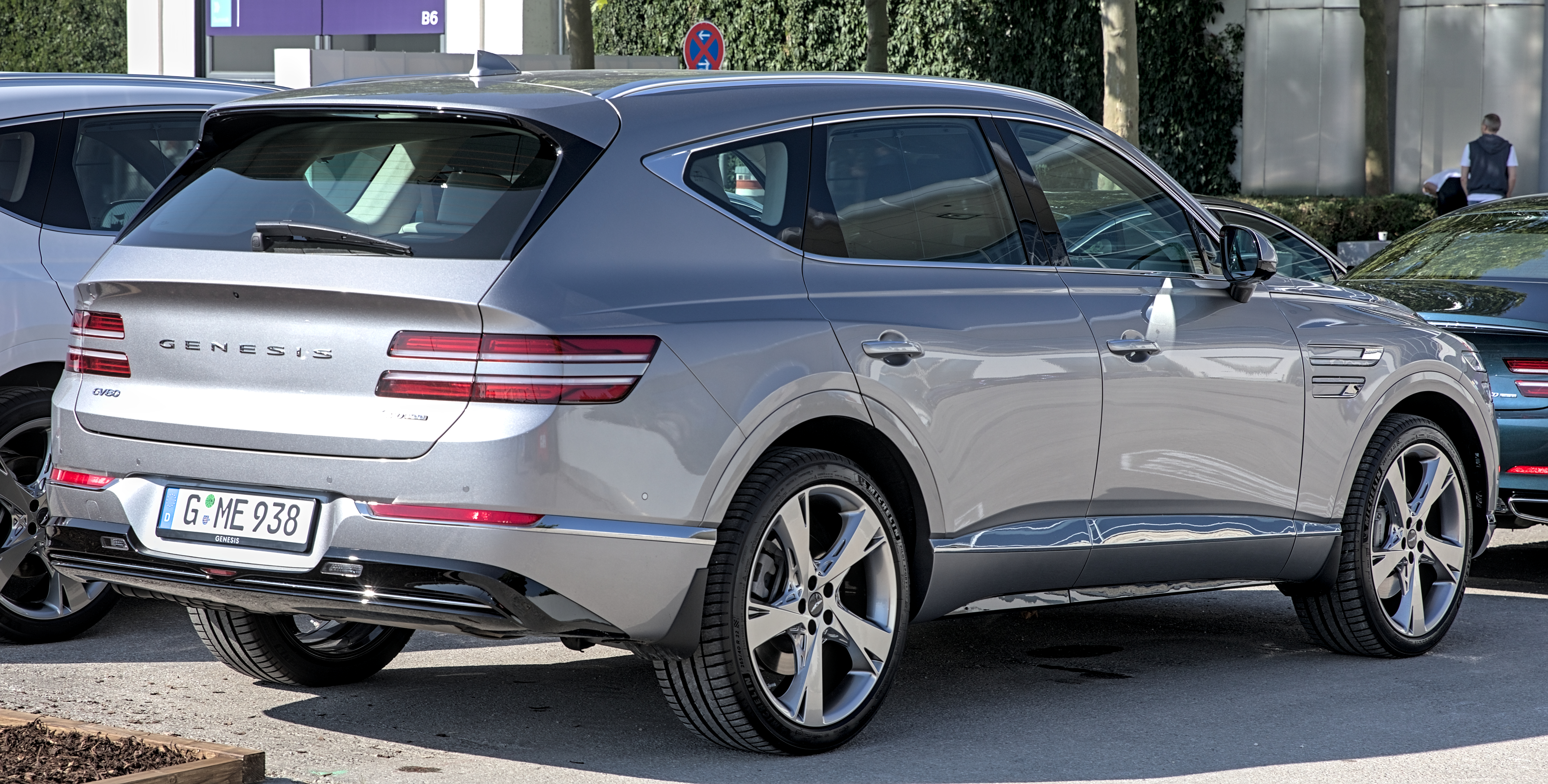
Rear view (pre-facelift)

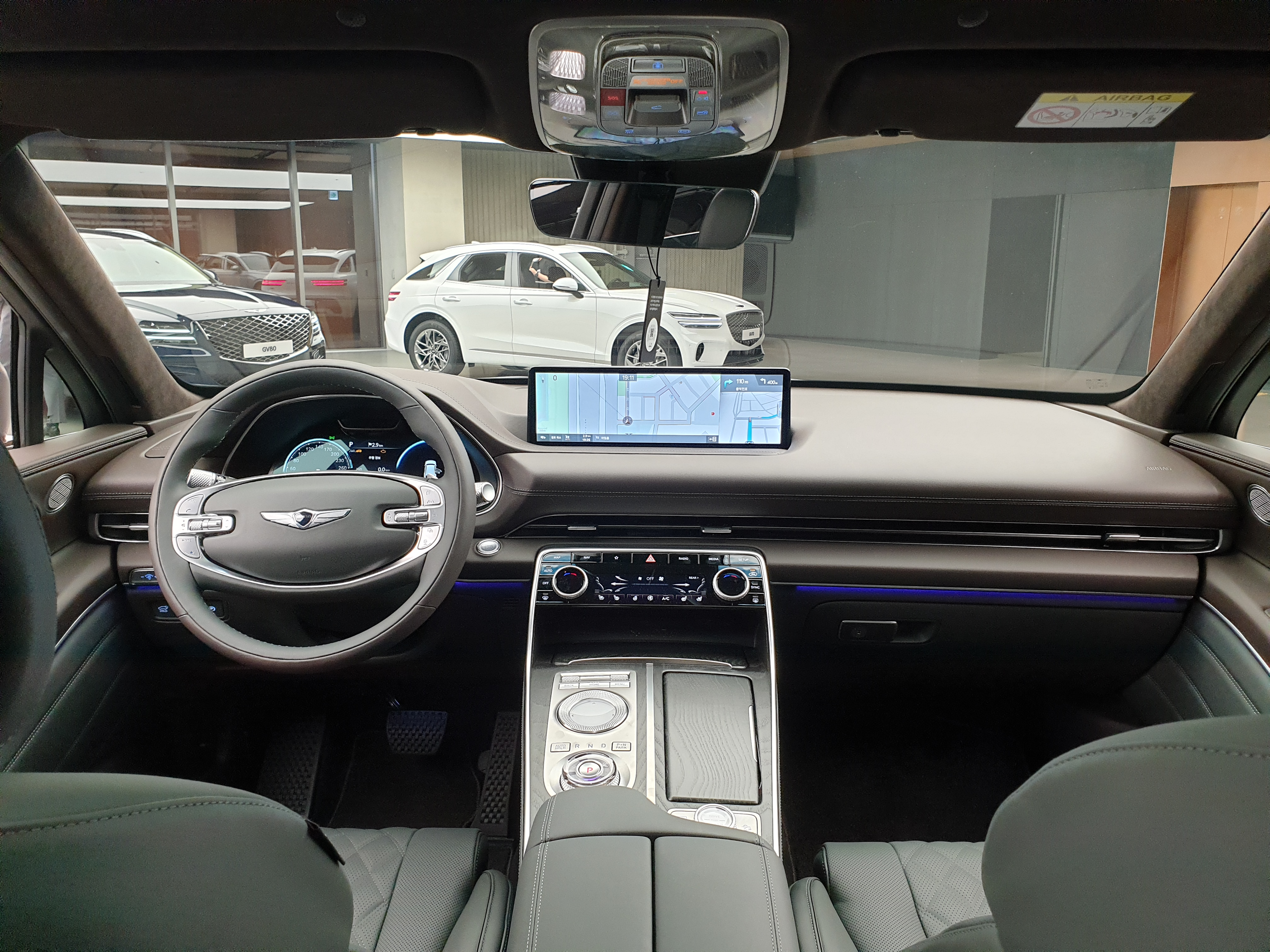
Interior (pre-facelift)

=== GV80 Concept ===
The GV80 was previewed by a concept of the same name, equipped with an electric powertrain and hydrogen fuel cell, which debuted at the New York International Auto Show in 2017. The GV80 Concept was styled by Luc Donckerwolke as his first project for the marque after he had moved from Bentley. Hyundai suspended development of hydrogen cars in 2021.

=== 2023 facelift ===
A refreshed GV80 was unveiled on September 27, 2023, and went on sale in South Korea on October 11, 2023. Changes include redesigned headlamps, front grille, wheels, climate controls and center console. A new 27-inch OLED screen replaced the 12.3-inch instrument cluster and 14.5-inch infotainment screen with dual 14.6-inch touchscreens for rear passengers. The Lexicon sound system was changed to a Bang & Olufsen sound system as well.

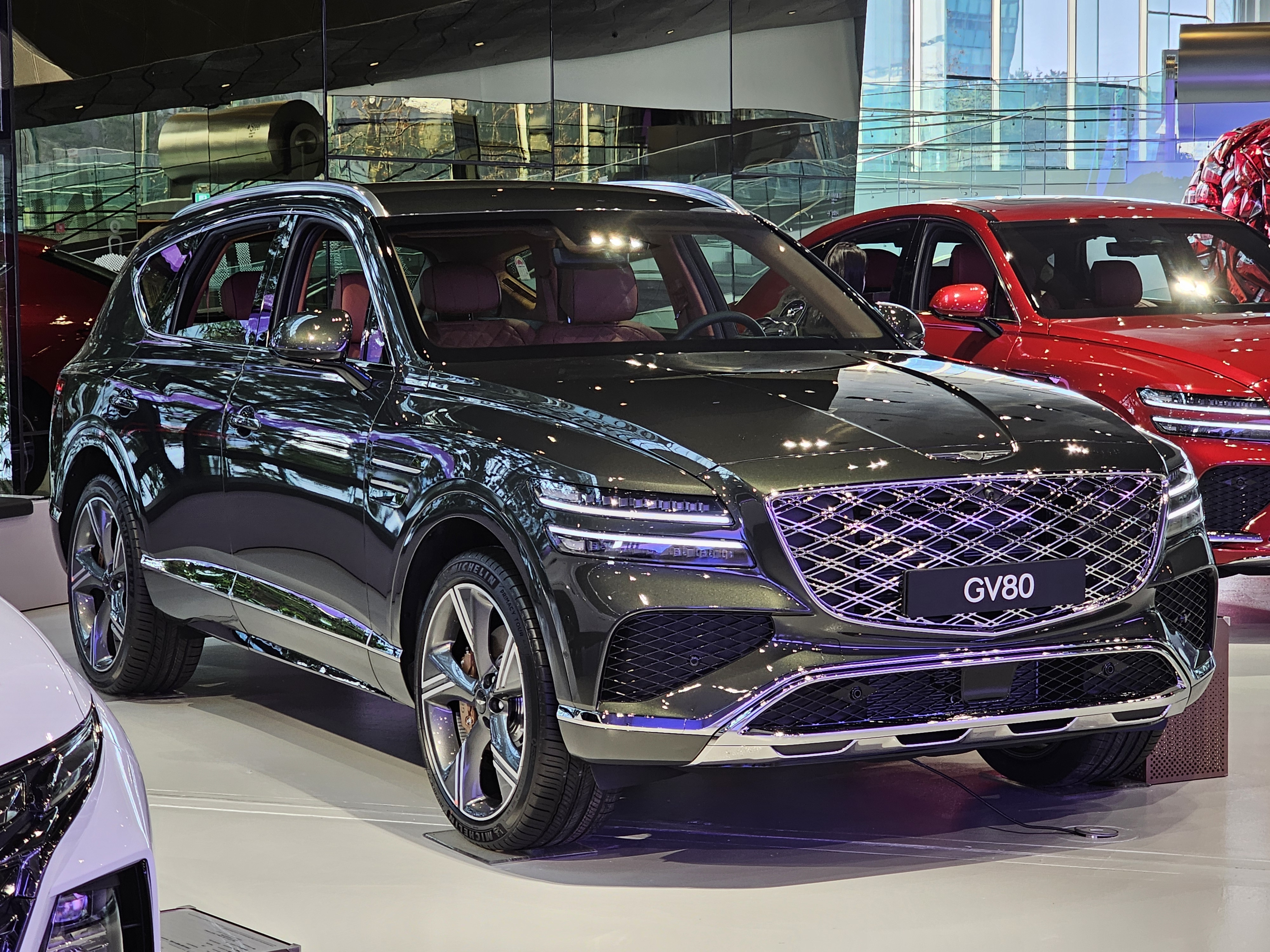
Front view (facelift)

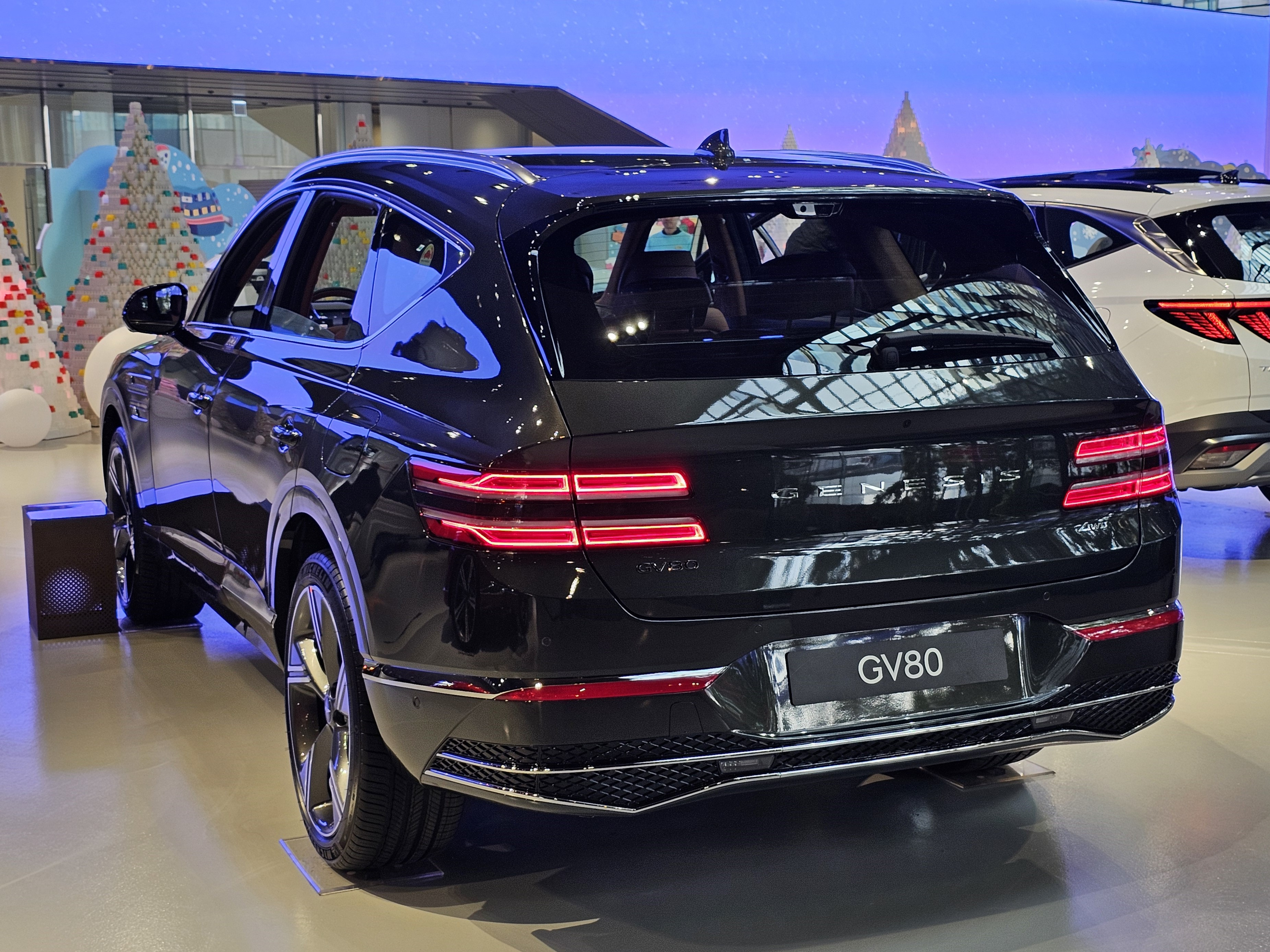
Rear view (facelift)

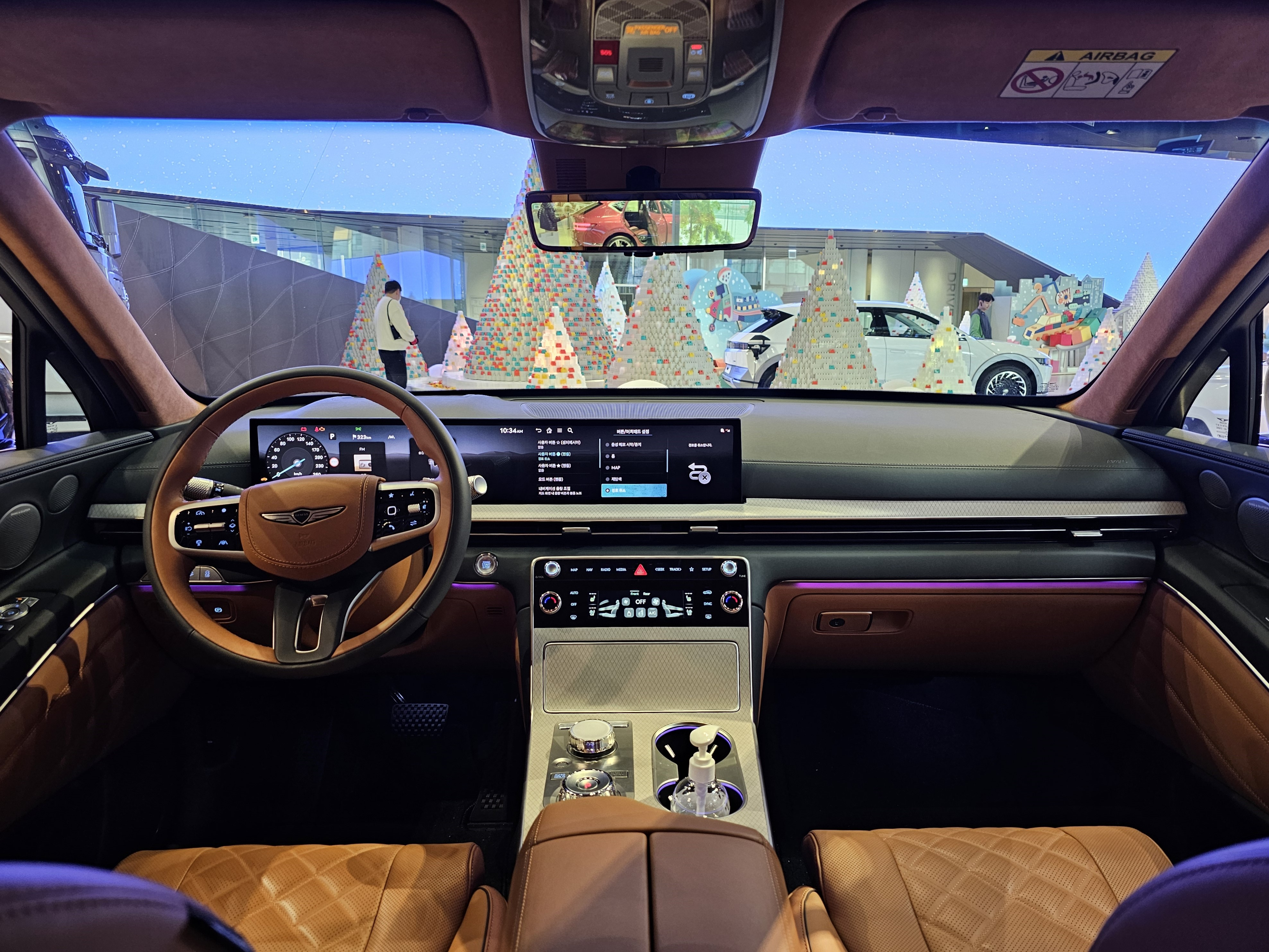
Interior (facelift)

=== GV80 Coupe ===
The GV80 Coupe was unveiled on September 27, 2023 and went on sale in South Korea on October 11, 2023. It is based on the refreshed GV80, with changes like a coupe inspired roofline, redesigned front bumper and grille, flat bottom steering wheel, and carbon fiber interior trims. The GV80 Coupe also can be configured with an optional higher powered 3.5-litre turbocharged engine that adds a 48V electric supercharger.

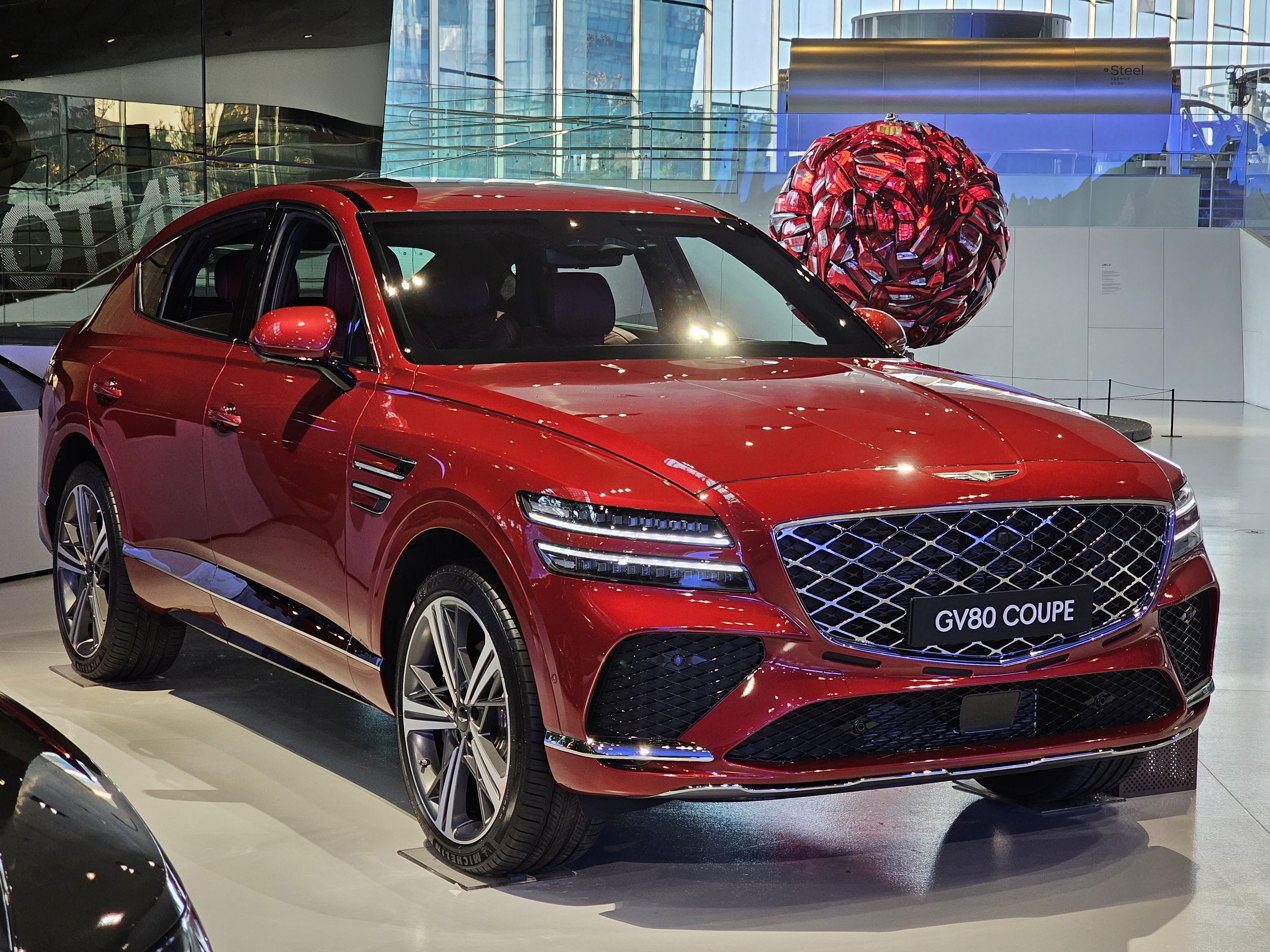
GV80 Coupe

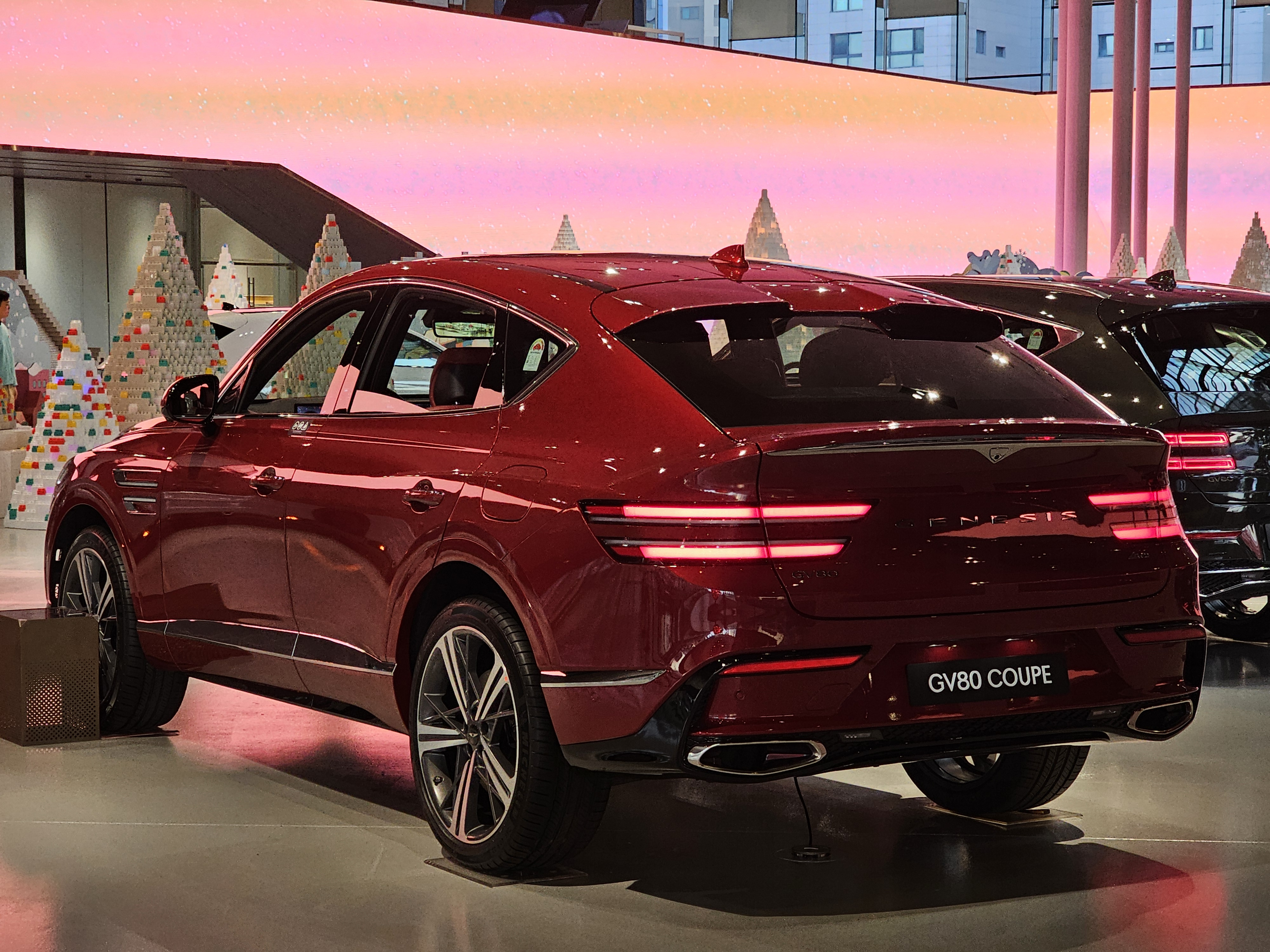
Rear view

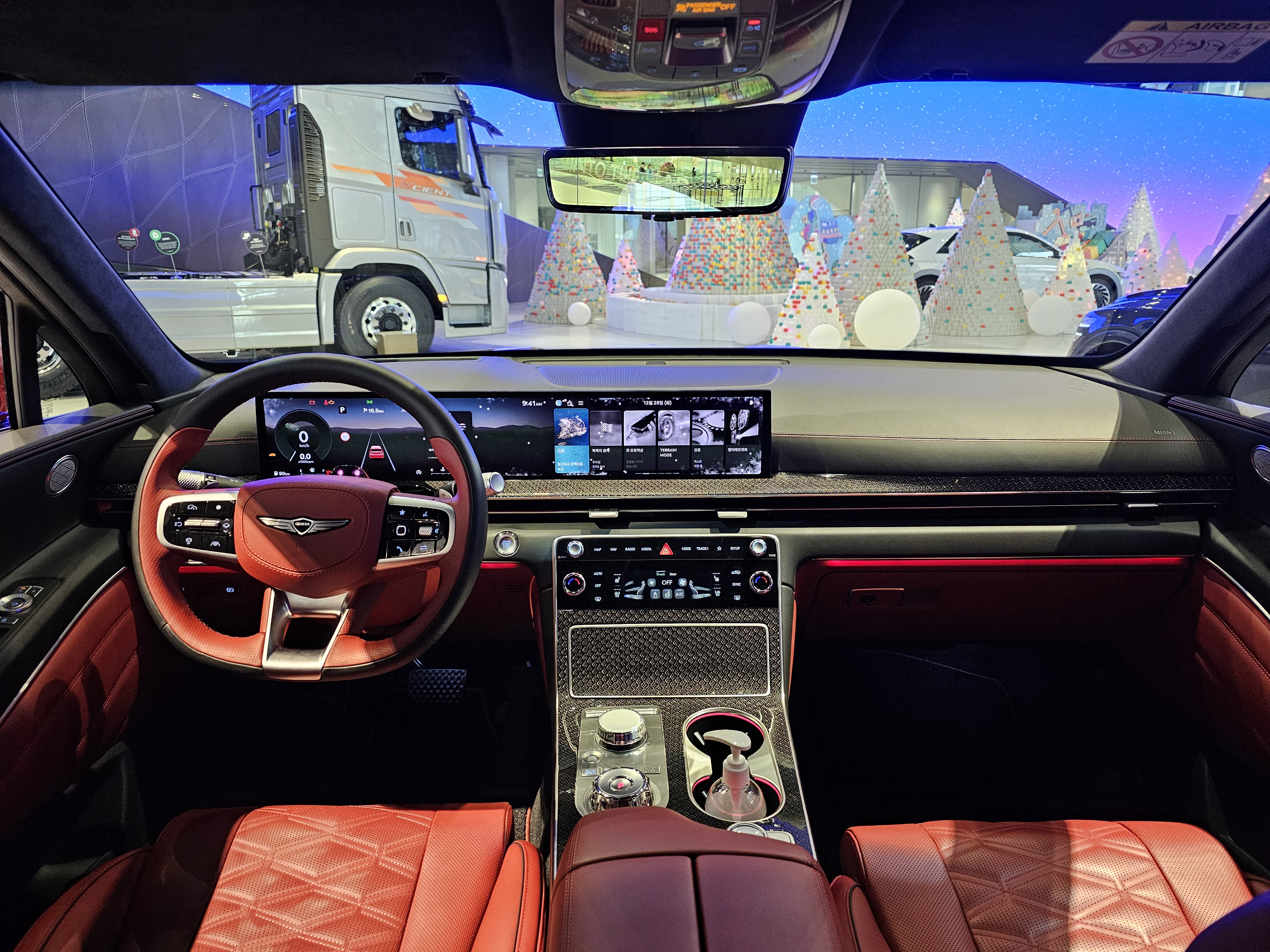
Interior

=== Safety ===
Euro NCAP test results Genesis GV80 3.0CRDi GLS (LHD) (2021)
| Test | Points | % |
|---|---|---|
| Overall: | 5 /5 stars | |
| Adult occupant: | 34.9 | 91% |
| Child occupant: | 43 | 87% |
| Pedestrian: | 36 | 66% |
| Safety assist: | 14.2 | 88% |

ANCAP test results Genesis GV80 AWD 2.5 litre petrol & 3.0 litre diesel variants only (2021, aligned with Euro NCAP)
| Test | Points | % |
|---|---|---|
| Overall: | 5 /5 stars | |
| Adult occupant: | 34.93 | 91% |
| Child occupant: | 43.41 | 88% |
| Pedestrian: | 36.04 | 66% |
| Safety assist: | 12.69 | 79% |

== Markets ==
=== South Korea ===
On August 30, 2021, the GV80 was officially released with a change in the model year. The 2022 GV80 added a six-seater model with independent seats in the second row from the existing 5/7-seat model. In addition, it expanded the front-wheel monoblock brake caliper to the petrol 2.5 turbo model and 3.0 diesel model. It also added a copper color to the caliper of the petrol 3.5 turbo model.

Mauna Red and Barossa Burgundy (glossy/matte) were added to the exterior, while Urban Brown and Vanilla Beige two-tone colors were added to the standard design model.

=== United States ===
In the United States, it was launched in November 2020 for the 2021 model year. It is available in rear-wheel drive, for the Standard, Advanced and Prestige trim levels and powered by the 2.5-litre turbocharged engine. All-wheel drive is also offered with the 3.5-litre V6 twin-turbo for the AWD Standard, AWD Advanced, AWD Advanced+ and AWD Prestige trim levels available.

== Powertrain ==
Engines
| Model | Years | Transmission | Power/rpm | Torque/rpm | Acceleration 0–100 km/h (0–62 mph) (official) | Top Speed |
Petrol
| Smartstream G2.5 T-GDi | 2020–present | 8-speed automatic | 304 PS (224 kW; 300 hp) at 5,800 rpm | 43 kg⋅m (422 N⋅m; 311 lb⋅ft; 43 kg⋅m) at 1,650–4,000 rpm | 6.9 s–7.7 s | 237 km/h (147 mph) |
| Smartstream G3.5 T-GDi | 2020–present | 8-speed automatic | 380 PS (279 kW; 375 hp) at 5,800 rpm | 54 kg⋅m (530 N⋅m; 391 lb⋅ft; 54 kg⋅m) at 1,300–4,500 rpm | 5.5 s | 240 km/h (149 mph) |
| Smartstream G3.5 T-GDi e-S/C | 2023–present | 8-speed automatic | 415 PS (305 kW; 409 hp) at 5,800 rpm | 56 kg⋅m (549 N⋅m; 405 lb⋅ft; 56 kg⋅m) at 1,300–4,500 rpm | 5.4 s(Coupe) | |
Diesel
| Smartstream D3.0 CRDi | 2020–2022 | 8-speed automatic | 278 PS (204 kW; 274 hp) at 3,800 rpm | 60 kg⋅m (588 N⋅m; 434 lb⋅ft; 60 kg⋅m) at 1,500–3,000 rpm | 6.8 s–7.5 s | 230 km/h (143 mph) |
| Smartstream D3.0 CRDi | 2022–2023 | 8-speed automatic | 273 PS (201 kW; 269 hp) at 3,800 rpm | 60 kg⋅m (588 N⋅m; 434 lb⋅ft; 60 kg⋅m) at 1,500–3,000 rpm | 6.8 s–7.5 s | 230 km/h (143 mph) |

== Recall ==
In June 2020, Hyundai Motor suspended delivery of the diesel powered GV80, as the company determined there were engine vibration issues due to carbon buildup. In September 2020, Hyundai Motor recalled 8,783 GV80s because of engine stall. Since the vehicle was launched in January, there have been eight recalls, four of which involved the engine.

== Sales ==
| Calendar Year | South Korea | United States | Canada | China | Global |
|---|---|---|---|---|---|
| 2020 | 34,217 | 1,517 | 276 | | 43,158 |
| 2021 | 24,591 | 20,316 | 1,553 | | 48,072 |
| 2022 | 23,439 | 17,521 | | | 46,300 |
| 2023 | 28,860 | 19,697 | | 320 | 56,469 |
| 2024 | 39,369 | 24,301 | | 65 | 68,026 |
| 2025 | | | | 37 | |
