= Busan International Mobility Show =

Korean automobile exposition

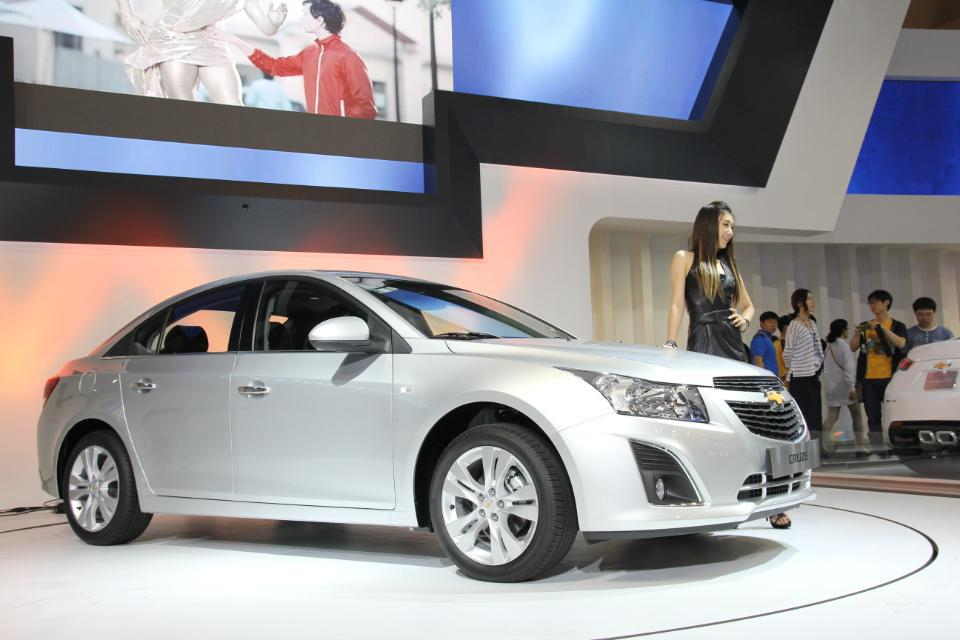
- Chevrolet Cruze facelift at the Busan Auto Show
- Status: Active
- Venue: BEXCO
- Location: Busan, South Korea
- Country: South Korea
- Inaugurated: 2001–present
- Website: eng.bimos.co.kr

Busan International Mobility Show (BIMOS), which first convened as the inaugural exhibition for BEXCO in 2001, is held biennially as part of efforts to promote the regional automotive industry and galvanize the local economy. The show has become an ultra-large scale event that routinely attracts more than one million visitors. It was known as the Busan International Motor Show prior to 2024.

The exhibition halls at BEXCO (measuring 26,508 square-meters) housed more than 170 cars and trucks on display in 2012. This number exceeds the 109 cars and trucks that were displayed at the 2010 event.

== 2026 ==
- Hyundai Elantra (8th Generation)

== 2024 ==
- Hyundai Casper Electric
- Renault Grand Koleos

== 2020 ==
The 2020 motor show was scheduled for 28 May to 7 June but was cancelled and not rescheduled. All Japanese manufacturers had declined to exhibit and only five marques were confirmed before the cancellation in April.

== 2018 ==
Held in June 2018, 4 domestic and 15 overseas carmakers introduced a total of 203 vehicles. Some international marques did not attend, including Bentley, Ford, Maserati and Volkswagen. 650,000 people attended the show.

- Hyundai HDC-2 Grandmaster concept world premiere
- Kia SP SUV concept
- Kia Niro EV
- GM Korea launched the Chevrolet Equinox

== 2016 ==
The 2016 show ran from 2 June for a 10-day run under the slogan “Inspiring Technology Making Waves in the Future”. About 230 vehicles from 25 domestic and foreign brands took part.

- Chevrolet Camaro Asia launch
- Genesis G80 international launch
- Maserati Levante Asia launch
- Renault Samsung QM6

== 2012 ==
The 6th Busan International Motor Show opened at BEXCO in the southern coastal city on Thursday featuring 22 domestic and foreign brands. More foreign brands showcase their models in this year's show than ever before, while domestic automakers try to draw visitors with modified versions of existing models as well as hybrid vehicles. Organizers expect around one million people to visit the show by the time it wraps up on June 3. Reflecting the theme of “The Voyage of the Green Car across the Ocean” adopted by the 2012 Busan International Motor Show, most automotive brands from Korea and elsewhere will spotlight their eco-friendly vehicles.

- Chevrolet Cruze (facelift)
- Daewoo Restar
- SsangYong Rexton W

== 2010 ==
- Daewoo Alpheon
- Hyundai Elantra / Avante

== 2008 ==
- Daewoo Winstorm MaXX
- Hyundai Genesis Coupe 380GT

== 2006 ==
The Busan International Motor Show in South Korea this year features four world-debut vehicles, with 25 manufacturers, and 171 automotive related companies from 10 countries represented. The show press days were on April 27 and the public show runs from April 28 to May 7.

Located on the southeast of the Korean peninsula, Busan is the second largest city in South Korea. Busan is holding the show for the third time, and organizers are planning to hold a full-fledged motor show every two years, in alternation with the Seoul Motor Show.

- Daewoo G2X
- Kia Carens
- Hyundai Avante
- Hyundai Accent 3-door
- SsangYong Actyon Sports
- SsangYong Rexton II

== 2003 ==
- Hyundai Verna Rally Prototype
- Samsung SM5
- SsangYong Chairman
- SsangYong Chairman Limousine Concept
- SsangYong La Okean Concept
- SsangYong C. E. O. Concept
- SsangYong Entertain Concept
