= Luc Donckerwolke =

Belgian car designer

- Born: Lima, Peru
- Occupation: Car designer
- Employers: Hyundai Motor Company; Volkswagen

Luc Donckerwolke (born 19 June 1965) is a Peruvian-Belgian automotive designer, president, and chief creative officer of the Hyundai Motor Group and the Genesis automotive brand. Prior to joining the Hyundai Motor Group, he was the design director at Volkswagen Group's Bentley, Lamborghini, Škoda, and Audi brands. In 2022, a jury panel of 102 journalists among 33 countries named Donckerwolke the "World Car Person of the Year" for significantly impacting the automotive industry.

== Background ==
Donckerwolke was born in Lima, Peru, and educated in various South American and African countries before studying industrial engineering in Brussels and transportation design in Vevey, Switzerland.

He has a residence in Germany and in Brussels. His hobbies include motor racing, old cars, foreign cultures and learning languages. He speaks Dutch, Italian, French, Spanish, English, German, Korean, Mandarin, Japanese and Swahili.

== Career ==
Donckerwolke began his design career in 1990 with Peugeot in France. In 1992 he moved to Ingolstadt for a two-year stint at Audi Design. He spent 1994 to 1996 working at the Škoda Design Center in Mlada Boleslav, in the Czech Republic, where he contributed to the 1996 Škoda Octavia and 1999 Škoda Fabia.

After Škoda he returned to Audi responsible for concept development, operating out of Ingolstadt for one year and Munich for another. It was during this time he worked on the Audi A4 Avant and the Audi R8 Le Mans Racer. During his time at Audi, Donckerwolke was also responsible for the design of the Audi A2 concept and production car, which was known at the time for being innovative and ahead of its time, like many of his designs.

He was head of design at Lamborghini from 1998, where he was responsible for the 2001 Lamborghini Diablo VT 6.0, 2002 Lamborghini Murciélago and 2004 Lamborghini Gallardo, winning the 'Red Dot Award' in 2003 in recognition for his work on them. He also worked with Walter de'Silva to produce the 2006 Lamborghini Miura concept.

In September 2005, Donckerwolke was appointed SEAT Design Director overseeing the design of future SEAT models, replacing Walter de'Silva who was promoted to oversee design for the entire Audi Brand Group. He was tasked with progressing SEAT design from Walter de'Silva's directorship to a look that would bring increased brand awareness and sales to the marque. His first visible contribution to SEAT was the SEAT Tribu concept, unveiled at the 2007 Frankfurt Motor Show; he later penned the 2008 SEAT Ibiza.

In September 2012, Donckerwolke was appointed Bentley Director of Design, overseeing the design of future Bentley models, replacing Dirk van Braeckel who moved to Volkswagen Group Design. In June 2015 Bentley announced Stefan Sielaff as his successor: "Mr Sielaff replaces Mr Donckerwolke who has decided to leave the business and Volkswagen AG".

In November 2015, he was tapped to lead Hyundai Motor Group's Genesis luxury brand from 2016 and work together with Hyundai-Kia's chief designer Peter Schreyer. Donckerwolke replaced Peter Schreyer as Chief Design Officer of Hyundai Motor Group in 2017, a position from which he resigned in April 2020.

In November 2020, Donckerwolke rejoined Hyundai Motor Group as Chief Creative Officer (CCO) of the Group and the Genesis brand. He was named President of the Hyundai Motor Group in November 2022, retaining the position of CCO.

== Designs ==
- Škoda Octavia Mk1 (1996)
- Škoda Fabia Mk1 (1999)
- Audi A4 Avant (2000)
- Audi R8 Le Mans Racer (2000)
- Audi A2 (2000)
- Lamborghini Diablo VT 6.0 (2001)
- Lamborghini Murciélago (2002)
- Lamborghini Gallardo (2004)
- SEAT Tribu concept (2007)
- SEAT Ibiza / SEAT Ibiza SC / SEAT Ibiza ST Mk4 (2008)
- SEAT IBE concept (2010)
- Bentley Flying Spur (2013)
- Bentley EXP 10 Speed 6 (2015)
- Hyundai Kona (2017)
- Hyundai Palisade (2018)
- Hyundai Sonata (2020)
- Hyundai Elantra (2021)
- Hyundai Tucson (2021)
- Genesis GV80 (2020)
- Genesis G80 (2020)
- Genesis G90 (2019/2023)
- Genesis GV90 (2026)
