= Genesis Motor =

Luxury division of Hyundai Motor Group

Genesis
- Product type: Luxury vehicles
- Current owner: Hyundai Motor Company
- Country: South Korea
- Introduced: 2015; 11 years ago
- Ambassador: Sean (Sihyeok) Lee (Global Head of Genesis)
- Website: genesis.com

Genesis (Korean: 제네시스) is the luxury vehicle brand of the South Korean multinational conglomerate Hyundai Motor Group. Initially envisioned along with plans for Hyundai's new luxury Genesis sedan in 2004, Genesis was announced as an independent brand on 4 November 2015. Its first model, the Genesis G90, was released in 2017. Genesis models are designed in Rüsselsheim, Namyang, and Irvine, and produced in Ulsan. Genesis describes its design philosophy as "Athletic Elegance". By October 2025, the brand had expanded into 20 major markets, and its Genesis Magma Program formed part of its expansion into high-performance vehicles and motorsport.

Genesis was the first luxury division established by a South Korean automaker. The brand entered the United States in 2017 and Europe (including the United Kingdom) in 2021. In November 2025, Genesis surpassed 1.5 million units in cumulative global sales, reaching 1,510,368 units within a decade of its launch. In 2024, South Korea and United States comprised 57% and 33% of total sales, respectively. In December 2024, the Genesis Magma Racing Team was founded, with the GMR-001 LMDh car competing in the FIA World Endurance Championship from 2026.

== History ==
=== Conception and under Hyundai ===
Hyundai conceived "Concept Genesis" in 2003 and introduced its first model in 2007 as a "progressive interpretation of the modern rear-wheel drive sports sedan". The body design took three years and the total cost of the program was $500 million over a development period of 23 months. Reliability testing ran for 800,000 miles (1,300,000 km). There was internal debate whether to sell the Genesis as a Hyundai, or to launch a new brand for it, either as a separate retail chain, or through Hyundai dealerships. Hyundai introduced the Genesis as a Hyundai model in 2008 at the North American International Auto Show.

=== Stand-alone brand ===
Vice Chairman of Hyundai Motor Group, Chung Eui-sun, who is currently the Chairman of the company, led the entire process of launching the Genesis brand, from the initial planning stage to the recruitment of external personnel and organizational restructuring.

In 2015, Chris Hosford, Hyundai's United States spokesman, cited three main reasons for making Genesis a stand-alone brand: Genesis had already experienced seven successful years in the luxury car market; Genesis ranked among the top three segment sellers; and customers showed an interest in a separate series Genesis division.

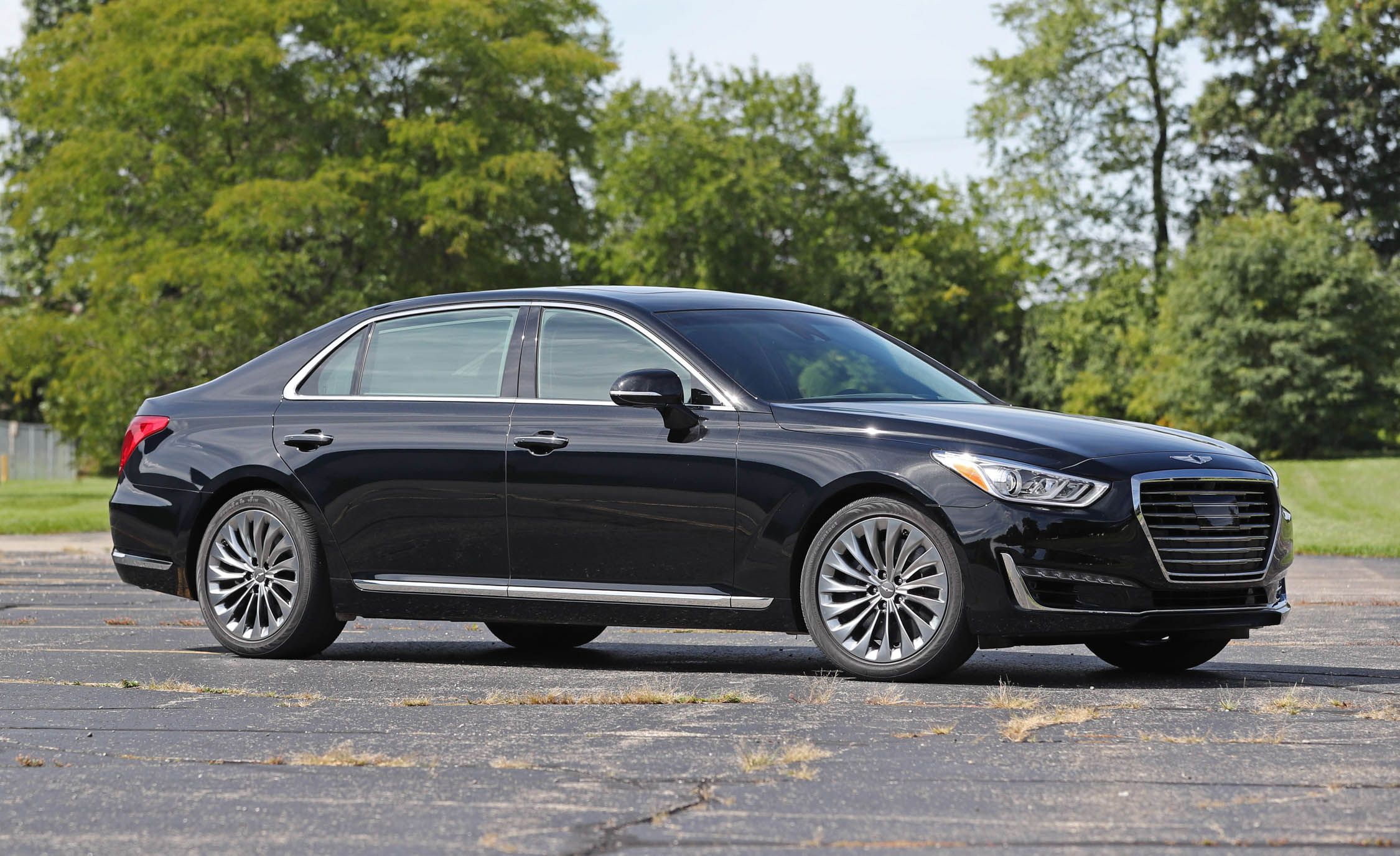
2017 Genesis G90 (HI) was the first Genesis model.

2017 Genesis G90 Facelift the Latest model.

Genesis Motor announced the launch of its first model, the G90 (EQ900 in South Korea), on 9 December 2015. Genesis launched in the United States in late 2016 with the G80 and G90. In the United States, Genesis vehicles are sold through certain existing Hyundai dealerships, with designated space for Genesis within the showrooms. In May 2021, Genesis launched in the European market alongside the debut of the Genesis G70. Genesis is now being marketed in Russia, China, the United Kingdom, South Korea, Indonesia, Saudi Arabia, the United Arab Emirates and the rest of Asia, Europe and the Middle East, as well as Oceania and North America.

The initial Genesis vehicle was marketed in South Korea as the Genesis G90, which is the brand's flagship model. In late 2016, the brand launched in the United States with two models: the G80 (previously sold as the Hyundai Genesis), and G90. On 14 September 2016 a third model, the Genesis G70, was unveiled in Namyang, South Korea. The G70 was introduced to the United States market during the 2018 New York Auto Show on 28 March 2018.

In September 2021, Genesis announced its electrification brand vision, which included launching all new vehicles as electric vehicles after 2025; The brand has decided to produce all new vehicles to be launched from 2025 as fuel cell-based or battery-based electric vehicles, and also plans to sell only electric vehicles in its sales network. The brand has established a plan to achieve carbon neutrality by 2035, making net carbon emissions zero by stopping the sale of internal combustion engine vehicles. In August 2024, a revised version of the plan was announced, which included a push for a hybrid transition.

The brand's first SUV, the GV80, formally debuted on 14 January 2020. In April 2021, Genesis unveiled its first production electric vehicle, the Electrified G80. At the 2021 Shanghai International Automobile Industry Exhibition, Genesis showed three new vehicles: the Electrified G80, the Genesis X Concept, and an EV-based Gran Turismo concept car. In August 2021, Genesis released images of the latest GV60, the new EV SUV for the brand.

Since the brand's launch in November 2015, a total of 1,008,804 vehicles have been sold through August 2023.

== Production ==
Assembly sites by model
Plant	Location	Country	Model(s)
Hyundai Motor Ulsan Plant	Ulsan, South Korea	South Korea	GV60, GV70/Electrified GV70, GV80, G70, G80, G90
Hyundai Motor Manufacturing Alabama	Montgomery, Alabama	United States	GV70/Electrified GV70

== Corporate affairs ==
=== Sales ===
Between November 2015 and October 2018, Genesis sold 206,882 vehicles; of the total, 127,283 were G80 models, 52,417 were G90 units, and 27,182 were G70s. Since its launch in November 2015, Genesis had surpassed 1.5 million cumulative global sales as of November 2025. The G80 became the first Genesis model to pass 500,000 cumulative units, reaching 501,517 units through November 2025.

Year	Units sold										
Year		30k	60k	90k	120k	150k	180k	210k	240k	270k	300k
Genesis Motor (since 2015)
2015	384										
2016	57,451										
2017	78,586										
2018	85,389										
2019	77,135										
2020	132,450										
2021	201,450										
2022	215,128										
2023	225,189										
2024	229,532										
2025	221,482										

=== Marketing ===
Genesis is an official sponsor of the NFL, Genesis Invitational at the Riviera Country Club, Scottish Open, and Condé Nast International Conference. Architect Rem Koolhaas designed the world's first ever Genesis showroom in Seoul's Gangnam district. Genesis Connected Services, a cloud-based service, features remote vehicle functions such as remote start with climate control and remote lock/unlock is available on iOS, Android and an Alexa skill developed with Amazon. The Genesis Intelligent Assistant was developed for Android and iOS, providing similar service to Genesis Connected Services.

=== Former designers ===
- Manfred Fitzgerald (2016–2019), former director at Lamborghini, was executive vice president & global head.
- Bozhena Lalova (2016–2019), former interior designer at Mercedes-Benz, headed colour and trim.
- Alexander (Sasha) Selipanov (2017–2019), former designer of the Bugatti Chiron and Vision Gran Turismo, lead exterior and advanced design.

=== List of Global Heads ===
- Manfred Fitzgerald (2016–2019)
- Yong-woo (William) Lee (2019–2020)
- Jaehoon (Jay) Chang (2020–2022)
- Mike (Min Kyu) Song (2023–2025)
- Sean (Sihyeok) Lee (2025–present)

== Automobiles ==
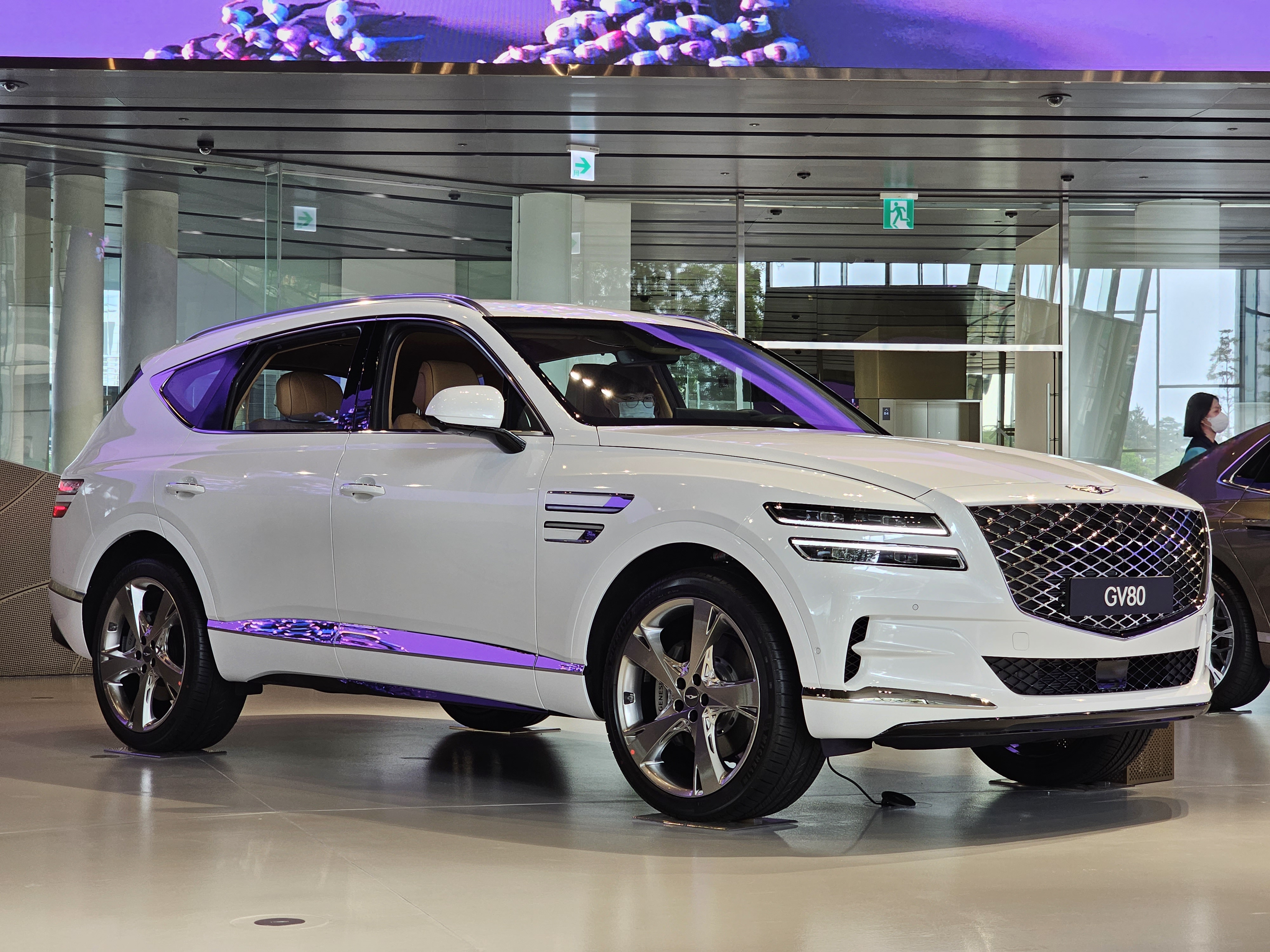
Genesis GV80

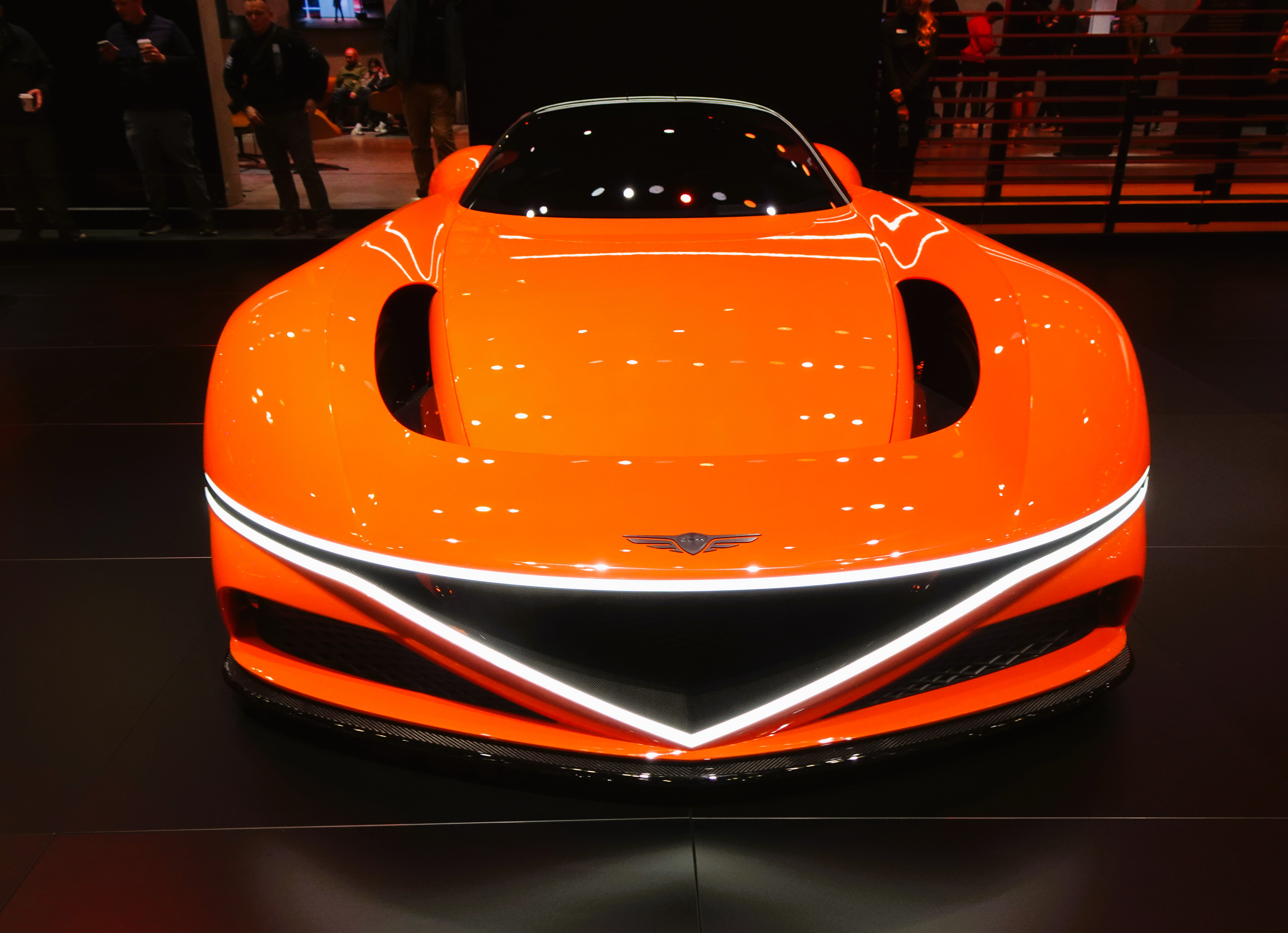
Genesis X Gran Berlinetta

=== Vehicle lineup ===
Genesis follows an alphanumeric naming convention; sedan models are named by combining the letter "G" with a number (70, 80, 90, and so on), while crossovers are named by combining the letters "GV" and a number. Battery-powered versions of internal-combustion models are denoted by the word "Electrified" preceding the alphanumeric.

=== Magma ===
Genesis Magma is a special trim sub-brand of Genesis.

== Motorsport ==
(South Korea) Genesis Magma Racing
- Founded: 2024
- Founder(s): Genesis Motor
- Base: Le Castellet, Var, France
- Team principal(s): Cyril Abiteboul (president)
- Current series: European Le Mans Series
- Current drivers: Development Drivers: (Germany) André Lotterer (Brazil) Pipo Derani; European Le Mans Series: 18. (United Kingdom) Jamie Chadwick (France) Mathys Jaubert (Spain) Daniel Juncadella
- Website: Genesis Magma Racing

On 12 September 2024, Hyundai Motorsport announced that it will enter the FIA World Endurance Championship through the LMDh program using the Genesis brand.

On 4 December 2024, It was announced that the team will be called Genesis Magma Racing, alongside the name and first renders and large scale model of the Genesis GMR-001. Also it was announced that the team will have support from with IDEC Sport and Oreca Motorsport. The car will join the FIA World Endurance Championship in 2026 and IMSA WeatherTech SportsCar Championship in 2027. Testing is due to start in the summer of 2025 and it will be done by André Lotterer and Pipo Derani. During 2025, the partnership with IDEC Sport will be used to get Genesis team members up to scratch with the ACO rules via a LMP2 driven by Jamie Chadwick and Mathys Jaubert in the 2025 European Le Mans Series. Former Formula One driver Logan Sargeant was initially included in the line-up before he "stepped away" from the program prior to the seasons' commencement. Sargeant's seat was later filled by Daniel Juncadella.

After the announcement, the team principal Cyril Abiteboul told journalists that the engine will be based on the one used in the sister brand Hyundai's WRC car.

At the 2026 24 Hours of Le Mans, Genesis Magma Racing made its Le Mans debut with two GMR-001 Hypercars. The No. 19 car, driven by Paul-Loup Chatin, Mathieu Jaminet and Daniel Juncadella, completed 372 laps and finished 13th overall, while the sister No. 17 car retired with a suspension failure.

== Personnel ==
Sean (Sihyeok) Lee is the Global Head of Genesis, appointed effective 8 December 2025 and promoted to Senior Vice President effective 1 January 2026. He succeeded Mike (Min Kyu) Song, who had served as Global Head of Genesis for the previous three years. Luc Donckerwolke, former design director of Volkswagen subsidiaries Bentley, Lamborghini and Audi, is chief creative officer. Claudia Marquez, former senior director of sales operations at Infiniti, is chief operating officer of Genesis North America. Markus Henne, former vice-president at Mercedes-Benz, is CEO of Genesis Motor China. SangYup Lee, former designer of the Bentley Continental GT and C-6 Chevrolet Corvette, is head of design. Filippo Perini, former Lamborghini head of design, is chief designer. Albert Biermann, former head of the BMW M performance division, oversees tuning and performance as executive vice president of performance development and high performance vehicles. Fayez Rahman, former development leader at BMW, is vice-president of architecture development. Andrea Jensen, former designer at Škoda and Volkswagen, heads colour and trim.
