= Genesis G70 =

Compact executive car

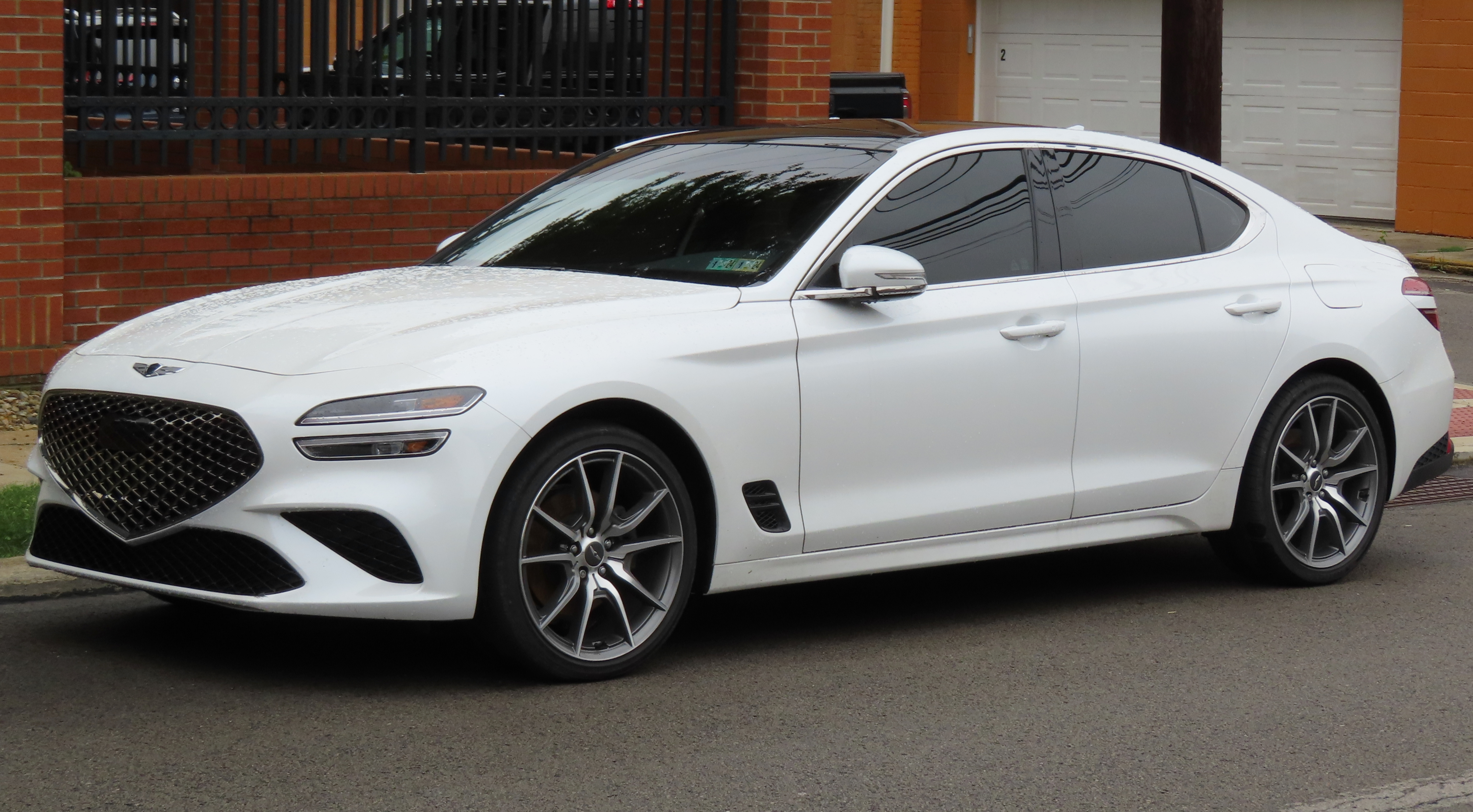
- 2022 G70 2.0T Prestige (facelift)

Overview
- Manufacturer: Genesis Motor (Hyundai)
- Model code: IK
- Production: September 2017 – present
- Model years: 2018–present (Middle East); 2019–present (North America)
- Assembly: South Korea: Ulsan
- Designer: Peter Schreyer (pre-facelift); Luc Donckerwolke (facelift)

Body and chassis
- Class: Compact executive car (D)
- Body style: 4-door sedan; 5-door shooting brake
- Layout: Front-engine, rear-wheel-drive; Front-engine, all-wheel-drive
- Platform: Hyundai M2
- Related: Kia Stinger

Powertrain
- Engine: Gasoline: 2.0 L Theta II T-GDi I4; 2.5 L Smartstream G2.5 T-GDi I4; 3.3 L Lambda II T-GDi V6; Diesel: 2.2 L R II CRDi VGT I4
- Transmission: 6-speed M6VR2 manual; 8-speed A8LR1/A8TR1 automatic

Dimensions
- Wheelbase: 2,835 mm (111.6 in)
- Length: 4,685 mm (184.4 in)
- Width: 1,850 mm (72.8 in)
- Height: 1,400 mm (55.1 in)
- Curb weight: 1,595–1,778 kg (3,516–3,920 lb) (2.0T/2.5T sedan); 1,690–1,840 kg (3,726–4,057 lb) (2.2D/3.3T sedan); 1,650–1,875 kg (3,638–4,134 lb) (shooting brake)

The Genesis G70 (Korean: 제네시스 G70) is a compact executive car manufactured by the Korean luxury automaker Genesis, a luxury division of Hyundai Motor Group. It is offered as a four-door sedan and, for European markets, as a five-door shooting brake.

The G70 debuted on September 15, 2017, at the global launch event in Seoul's Olympic Park. Genesis Motor's third model, the G70 was designed to compete with compact executive sedans and serves as the brand's entry-level model, positioned below the larger G80 and G90 sedans. In 2019, the G70 was named the North American Car of the Year. The sedan received a facelift in 2020, and a five-door shooting brake variant followed for European markets in 2021.

== Overview ==
The Genesis G70 was under development for several years and was previewed by the Genesis New York Concept, shown at the 2016 New York International Auto Show. Its design was led under Peter Schreyer, then chief design officer of Hyundai Motor Group, who also oversaw the design of the related Kia Stinger. The G70 shares its rear-wheel-drive platform and engine range with the Stinger but uses a shorter wheelbase and a conventional sedan body in place of the Stinger's liftback. Development took place at Hyundai’s Namyang R&D Center in Hwaseong, South Korea.

The exterior design shares cues from the other two Genesis models, the G80 and the G90. The grille features Genesis' corporate design, with functional air intakes along the bottom and side. The LED headlights operate with separate daytime running lights. The rear is said to have an athletic stance, framed by LED taillights and dual exhausts.

The interior's center console is constructed out of soft-touch plastics, leather and metal accents that are slightly angled toward the driver. The layout has three large knobs for the climate controls, an eight-inch touch screen, and a small electronic shifter. The interior appointments on the G70 include quilted leather seating surfaces, along with brushed aluminum and stainless steel trim.

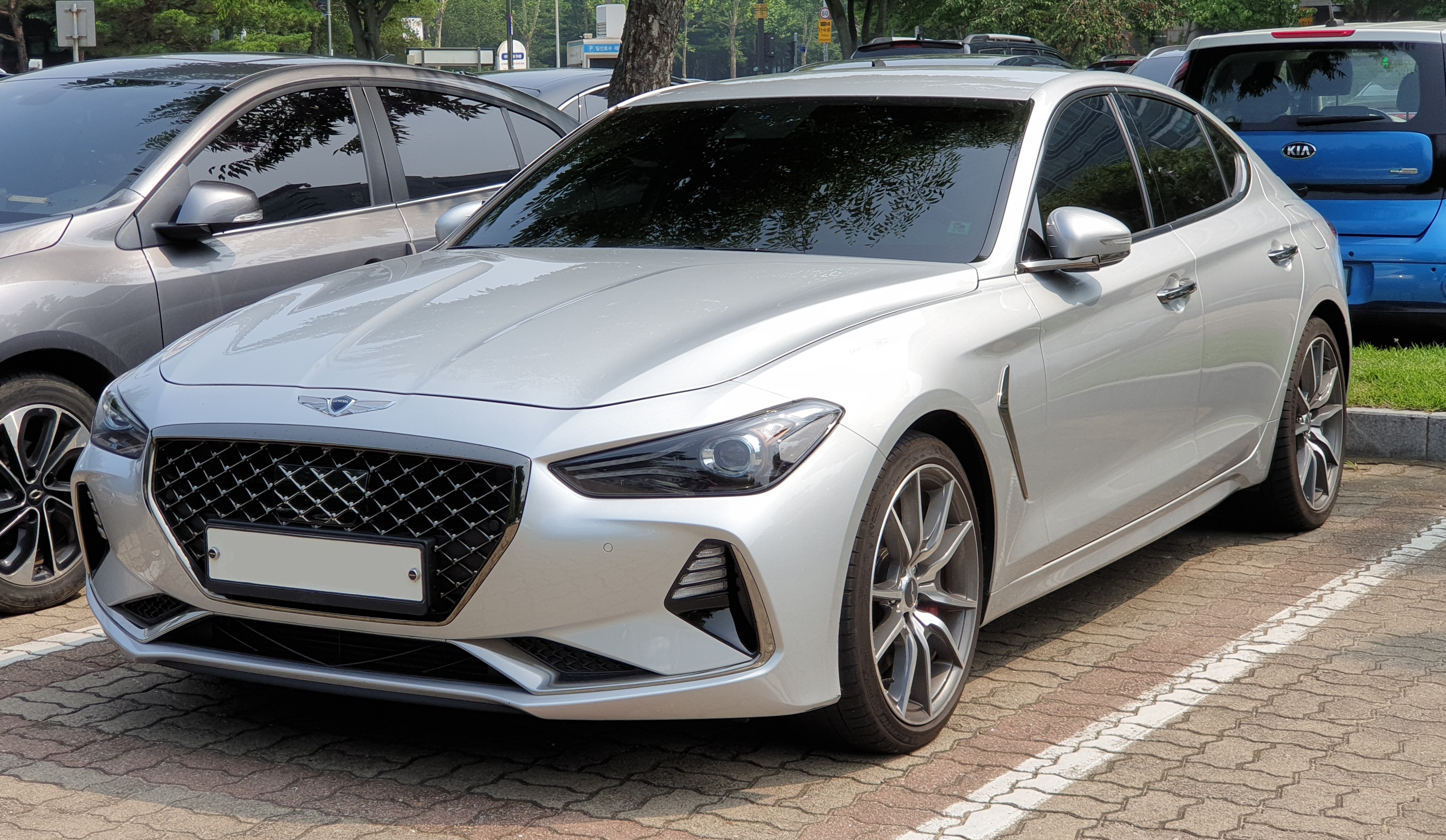
Genesis G70 2.0T (pre-facelift)

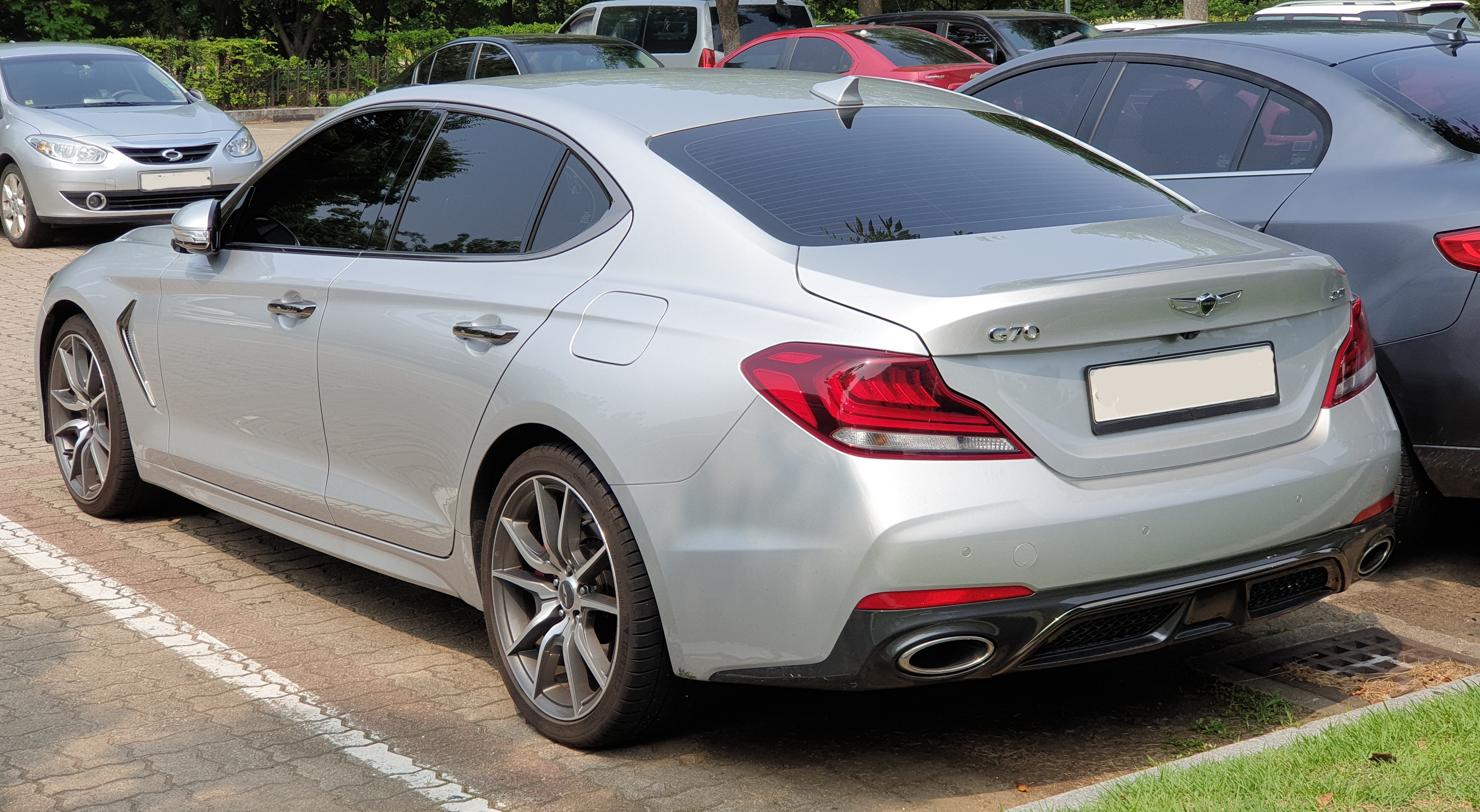
Rear view (pre-facelift)

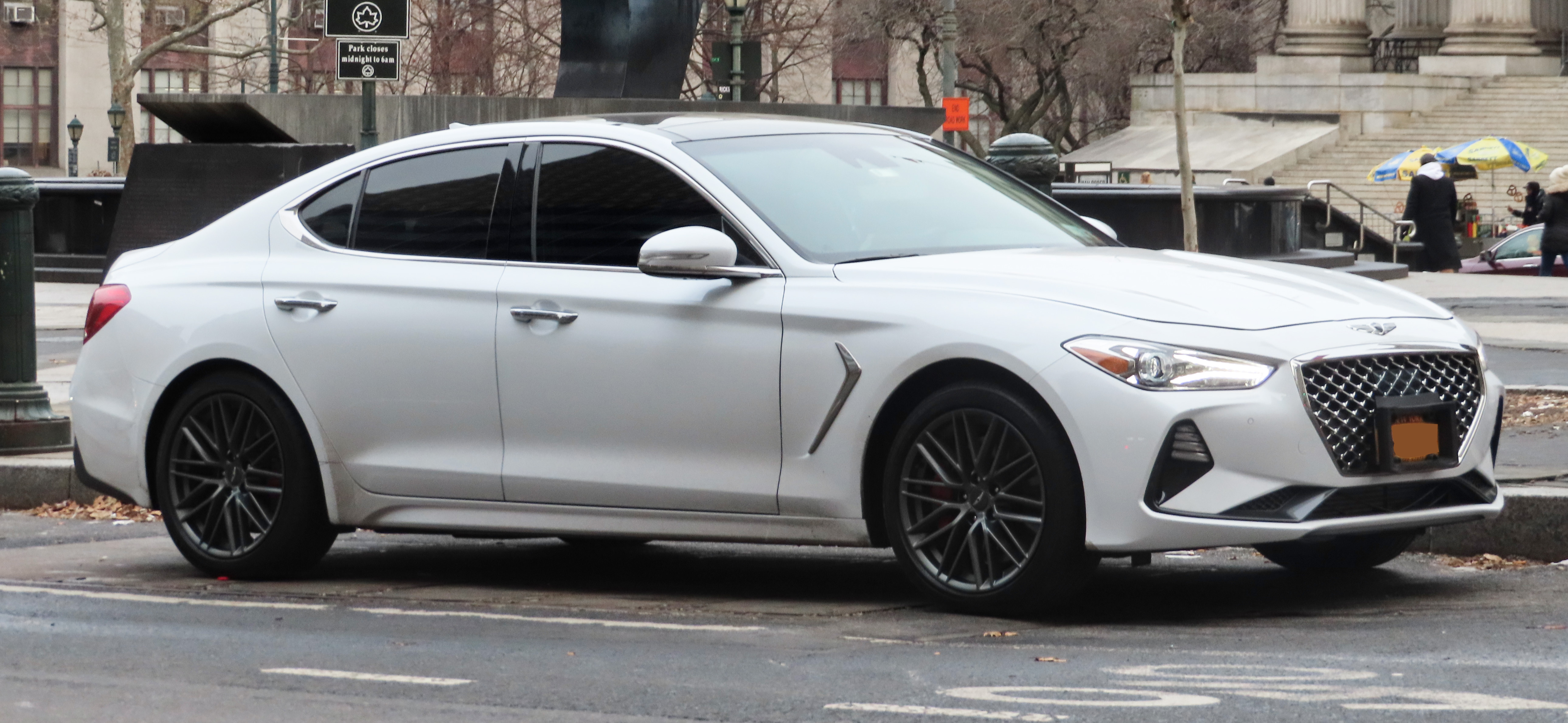
Genesis G70 3.3T (pre-facelift)

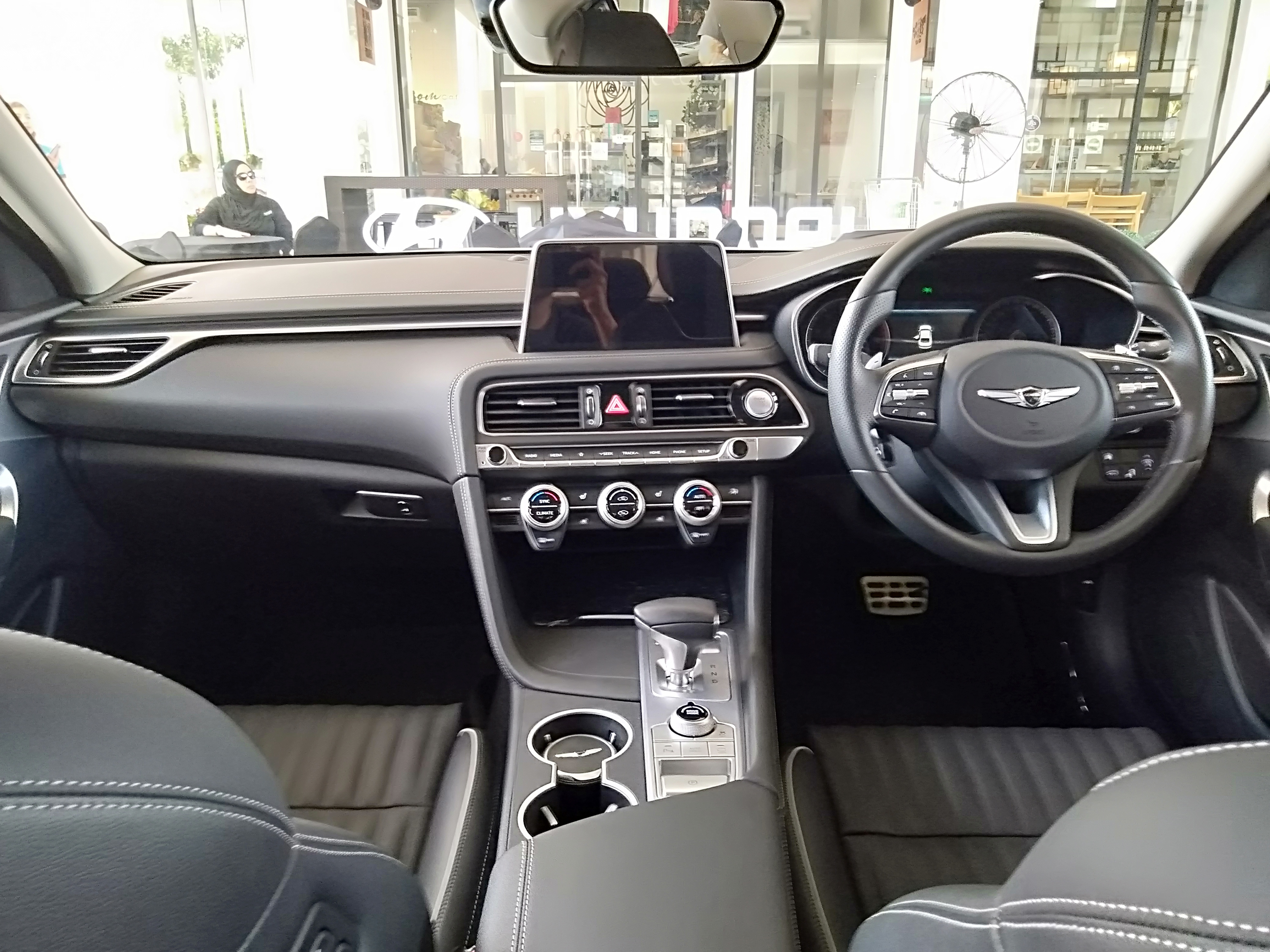
Interior (pre-facelift)

=== Annual Improvements ===
==== 2019 ====
In 2019, the electronic parking brake was made standard, and an optional electric power trunk became available to buyers. A 12.3-inch (31.2cm) 3D gauge cluster also became an option for South Korean-market 3.3T - equipped G70s.

==== 2020 ====
The 12.3-inch 3D gauge cluster, first introduced on South Korean 3.3T models in 2019, was extended as an option to 2.0T models. A carbon fiber package comprising carbon fiber-finished exterior mirrors and interior trim was offered in South Korea.

== Facelift ==
On September 8, 2020, Genesis announced a facelift G70, which went on sale in South Korean market on October 20, 2020. The facelift incorporates new corporate design cues from the GV80 crossover SUV and second generation G80 sedan, including new front and rear bumpers, headlights, taillights, and a new grille design. Interior changes include an optional 10.25-inch (26cm) infotainment screen. The 2020 facelift adopted Genesis's crest grille and two-line quad lamps, making the G70 the last sedan in the Genesis line-up at the time to adopt the family styling already used by the G90 and G80. Many evaluations were saying that the design of the previous model was better, and in particular, the taillights were criticized for looking forcibly inserted.

The facelift G70 was released as a 2022 model in the United States, where the optional manual transmission was discontinued. On May 19, 2023, Genesis released an updated G70 and G70 Shooting Brake in the South Korean market. The 2.0-liter turbocharged Theta II engine was replaced by a 2.5-liter turbocharged Smartstream engine, while Brembo brakes became standard. Additional changes included a touchscreen climate-control panel, a frameless rear-view mirror and various trim updates.

In January 2026, Genesis launched the 2026 G70 and G70 Shooting Brake in South Korea, making features including a head-up display, driver's seat memory system and power-adjustable steering wheel standard. The company also introduced the G70 Graphite Edition, based on the 3.3-liter turbocharged gasoline model and featuring model-specific performance and design changes. Separately, a Prestige Graphite trim was introduced for the North American market for the 2026 model year, also using the 3.3-liter twin-turbocharged V6 but with market-specific equipment.

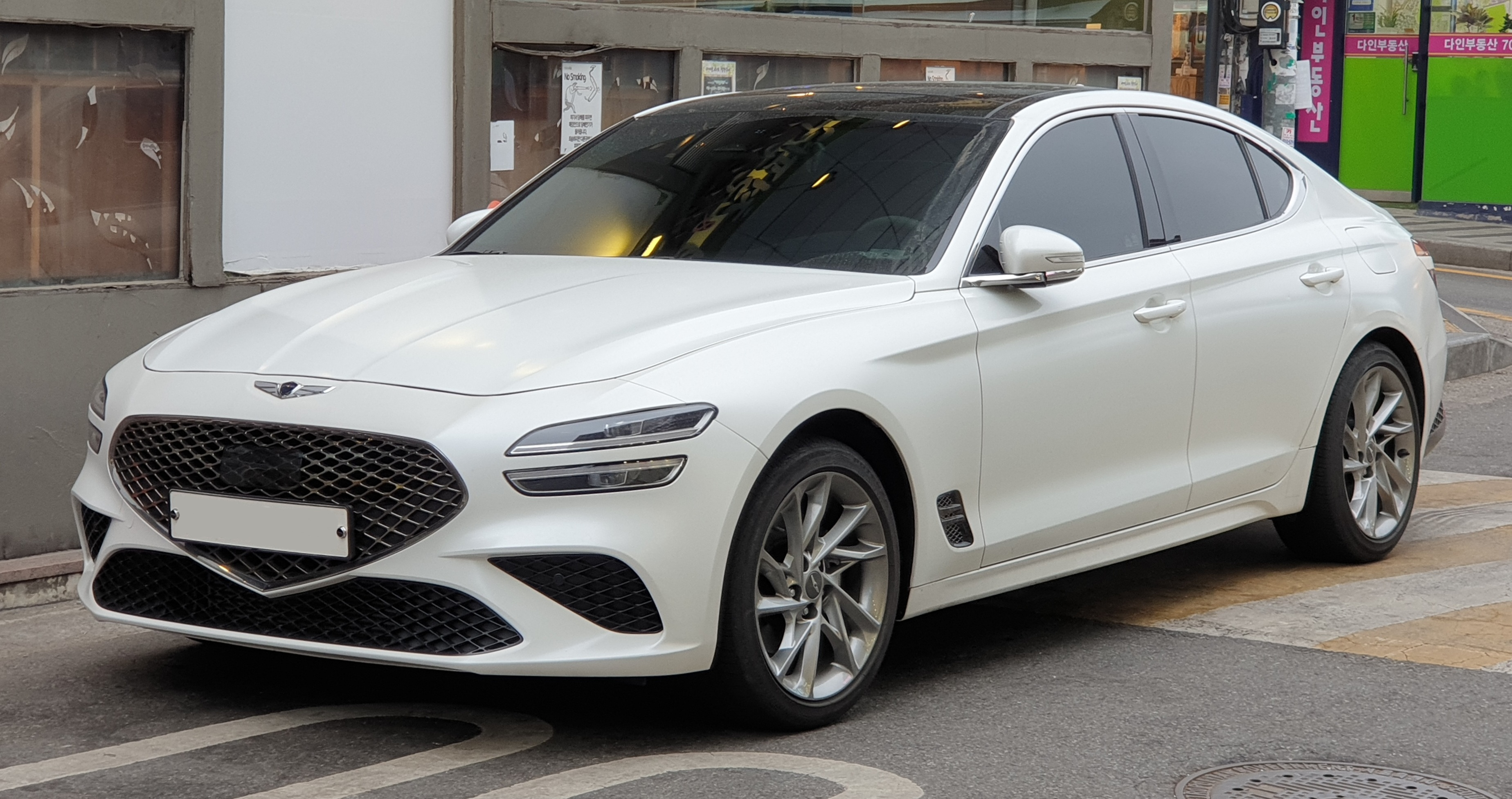
Genesis G70 (facelift)

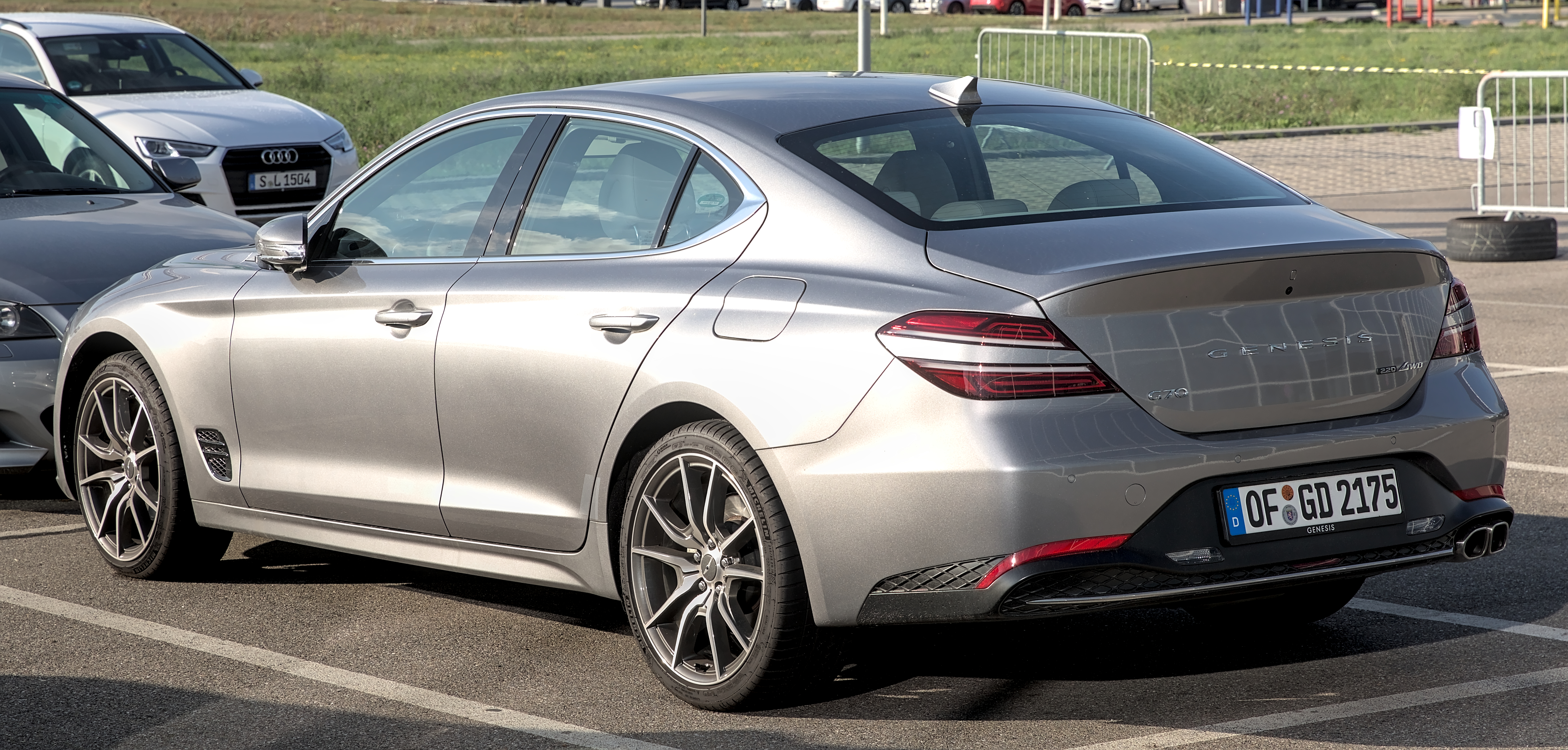
Rear view (facelift)

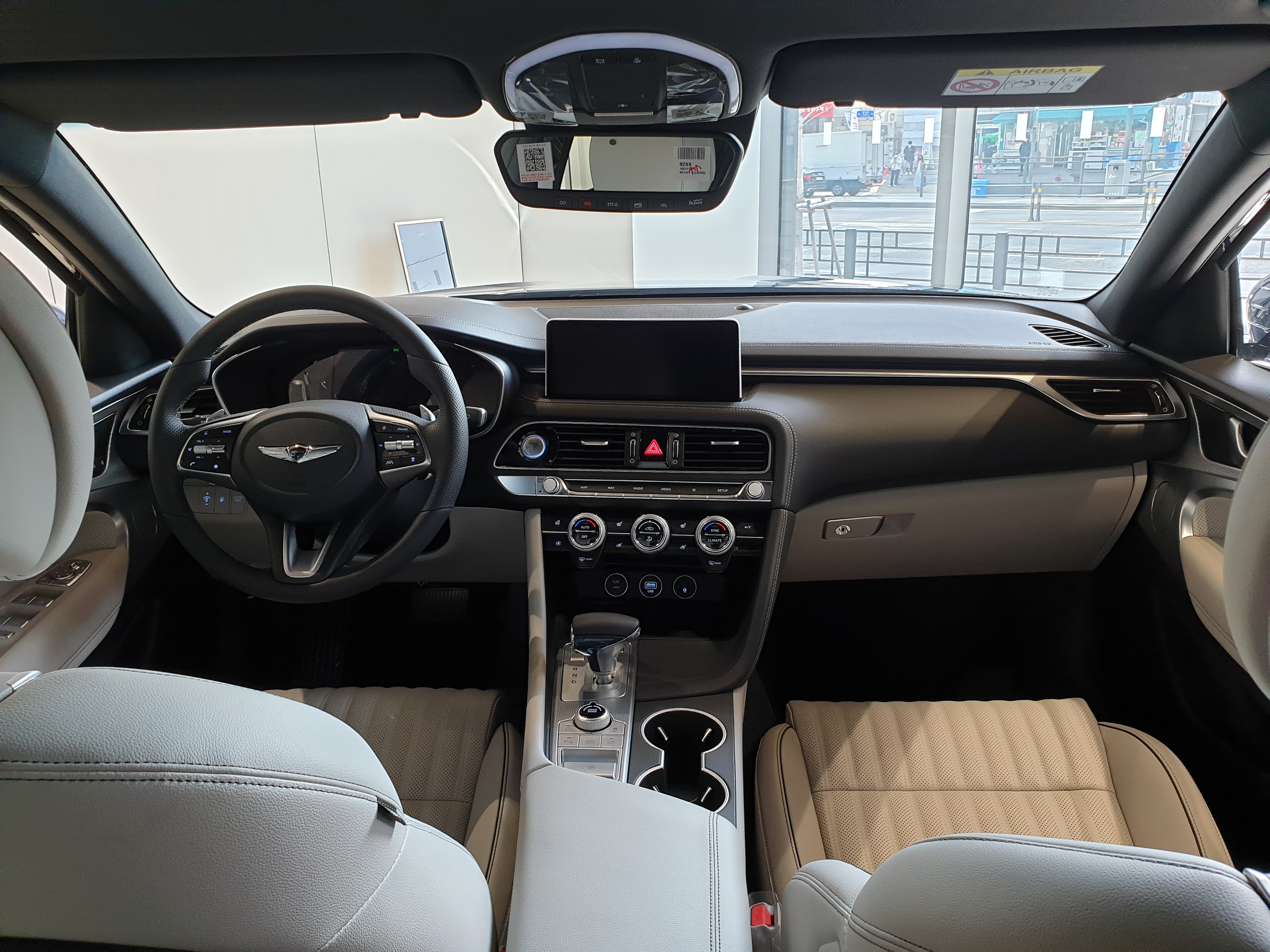
Interior (facelift)

== Shooting Brake ==
In May 2021, Genesis introduced the G70 Shooting Brake, a five-door station wagon derivative of the G70 sedan developed with European customers in mind. The rear end underwent the biggest changes, with a longer and slightly sloping roofline, while luggage capacity increased by 40 percent compared with the sedan. Interior and exterior images of the G70 Shooting Brake were unveiled on May 12, 2021.

At its European launch, powertrain options included a 2.0-liter turbocharged gasoline engine and a 2.2-liter diesel engine, both paired with an 8-speed automatic transmission. The G70 Shooting Brake went on sale in Europe in the second half of 2021. In South Korea, it was officially launched on June 27, 2022, with sales beginning on July 7. The Korean-market model was initially offered with a 2.0-liter turbocharged gasoline engine in Premium and Sport configurations. Its trunk provided 465 liters of cargo capacity, expanding to 1,535 liters with the rear seats folded. It was equipped with a 10-airbag system and driver-assistance features including Forward Collision-Avoidance Assist and Rear Occupant Alert. In addition, the 10.25-inch infotainment system supported Genesis CarPay and voice-recognition vehicle control.

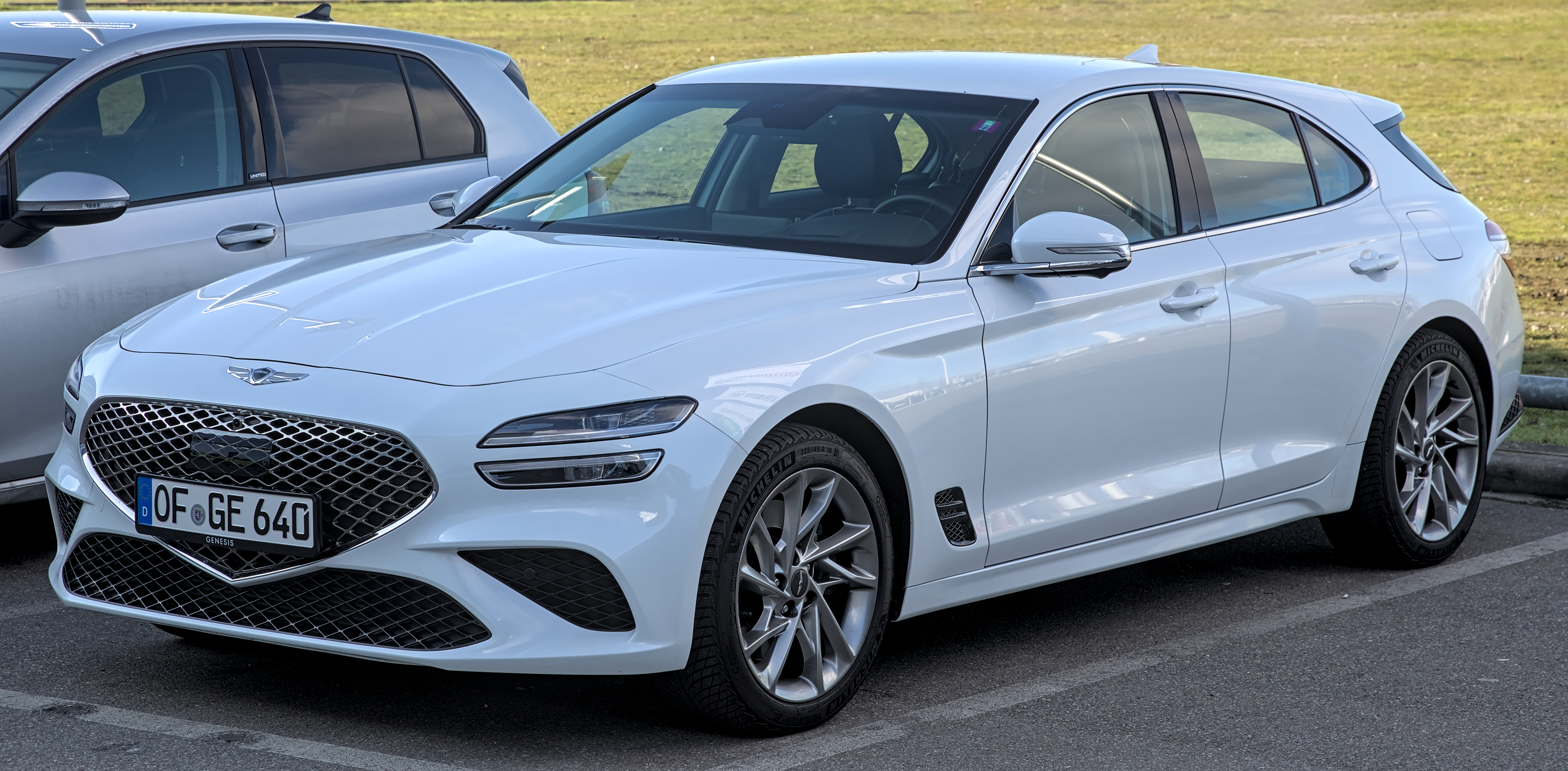
G70 Shooting Brake

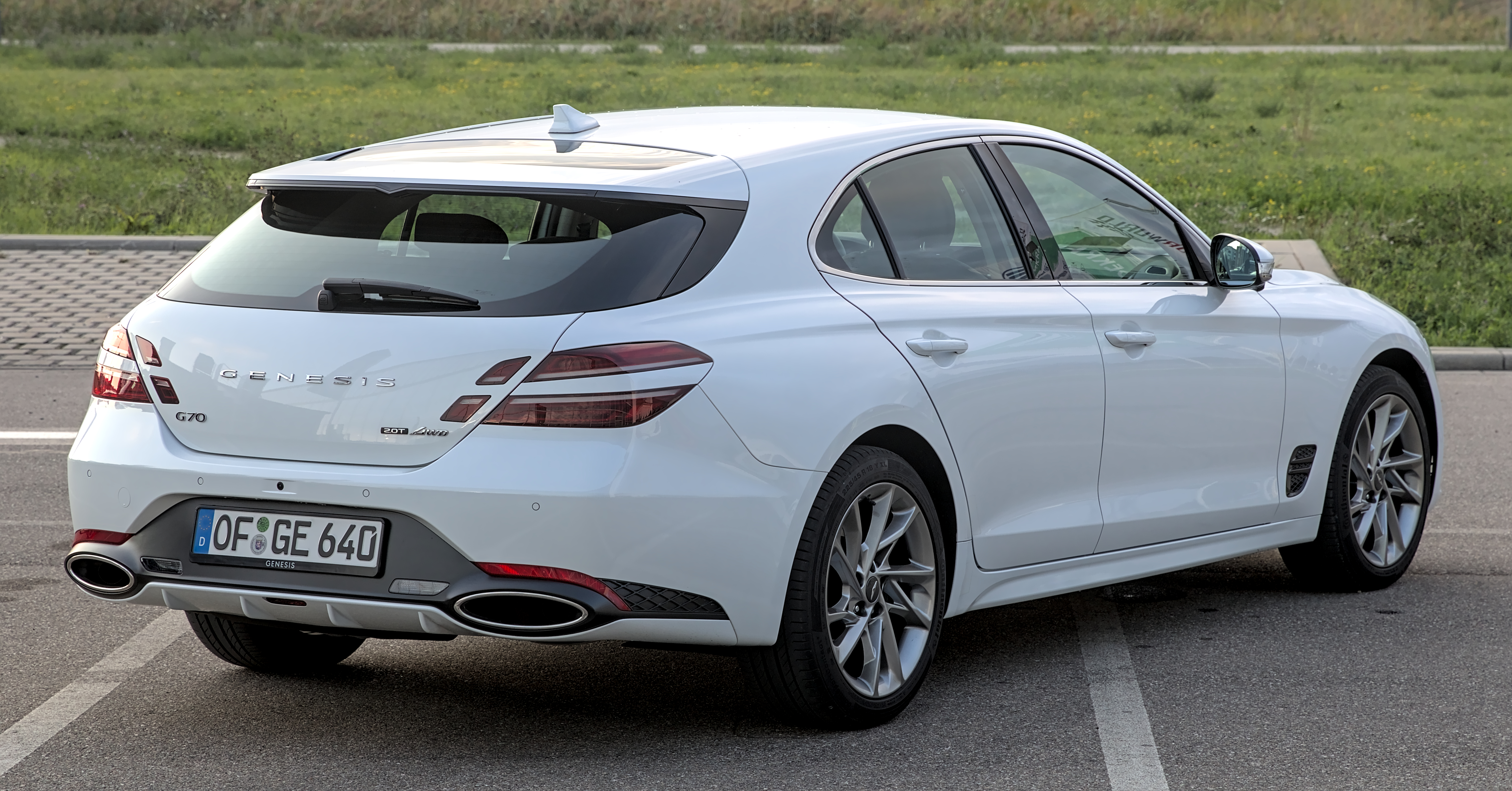
Rear view

== Powertrain ==
At launch, the Genesis G70 was offered, depending on market, with a 2.0-liter turbocharged four-cylinder engine producing 252 hp (188 kW) and 260 lb⋅ft (353 N⋅m) of torque, a 3.3-liter twin-turbocharged V6 producing 365 hp (272 kW) and 376 lb⋅ft (510 N⋅m) of torque, and a 2.2-liter turbo-diesel four-cylinder engine producing 199 hp (148 kW) and 325 lb⋅ft (441 N⋅m) of torque. Genesis estimated that the LSD-equipped 3.3-liter V6 RWD model could accelerate from 0–100 km/h (0–62 mph) in 4.7 seconds.

Rear-wheel drive and all-wheel drive were available, while a six-speed manual transmission was offered only with the rear-wheel-drive 2.0-liter model in North America. The manual transmission was discontinued for the 2022 model year.

In South Korea, the 2.0-liter turbocharged engine was replaced by a 2.5-liter turbocharged Smartstream engine in 2023.

G70
Model	Years	Transmission	Power/rpm	Torque/rpm	Acceleration 0–100 km/h (0–62 mph) (official)	Top Speed
Gasoline
Theta II 2.0 T-GDi	2021–present	8-speed automatic	197 PS (145 kW; 194 hp) at 4,500–6,200 rpm	36 kg⋅m (353 N⋅m; 260 lbf⋅ft) at 1,450–3,500 rpm	8.8 s (RWD)	224 km/h (139 mph)
Theta II 2.0 T-GDi	2021–present	8-speed automatic	245 PS (180 kW; 242 hp) at 6,200 rpm	36 kg⋅m (353 N⋅m; 260 lbf⋅ft) at 1,450–3,500 rpm	6.1 s (RWD); 6.6 s (AWD)	240 km/h (149 mph)
Theta II 2.0 T-GDi	2019–2021 model years (North America)	6-speed manual	255 PS (188 kW; 252 hp) at 6,200 rpm	36 kg⋅m (353 N⋅m; 260 lbf⋅ft) at 1,400–4,000 rpm	—	—
Theta II 2.0 T-GDi	2017–2023 (South Korea)	8-speed automatic	252 PS (185 kW; 249 hp) at 6,200 rpm 255 PS (188 kW; 252 hp) at 6,200 rpm	36 kg⋅m (353 N⋅m; 260 lbf⋅ft) at 1,400–4,000 rpm	5.9 s (RWD)	240 km/h (149 mph)
Smartstream G2.5 T-GDi	2023–present	8-speed automatic	304 PS (224 kW; 300 hp) at 5,800 rpm	43 kg⋅m (422 N⋅m; 311 lbf⋅ft) at 1,650–4,000 rpm	—	—
Lambda II 3.3 T-GDi	2017–present	8-speed automatic	370 PS (272 kW; 365 hp) at 6,000 rpm	52 kg⋅m (510 N⋅m; 376 lbf⋅ft) at 1,300–4,500 rpm	4.7 s (RWD); 5.0 s (AWD)	240 km/h (149 mph); 270 km/h (168 mph)
Lambda II 3.3 T-GDi	2020–present	8-speed automatic	373 PS (274 kW; 368 hp) at 6,000 rpm	52 kg⋅m (510 N⋅m; 376 lbf⋅ft) at 1,300–4,500 rpm	4.7 s (RWD); 5.0 s (AWD)	240 km/h (149 mph); 270 km/h (168 mph)
Diesel
R II 2.2 CRDi	2017–2021 (South Korea)	8-speed automatic	202 PS (149 kW; 199 hp) at 3,800 rpm	45 kg⋅m (441 N⋅m; 325 lbf⋅ft) at 1,750–2,750 rpm	7.4 s (RWD); 7.9 s (AWD)	230 km/h (143 mph)
R II 2.2 CRDi	2021-present (Europe)	8-speed automatic	200 PS (147 kW; 197 hp) at 3,800 rpm	45 kg⋅m (441 N⋅m; 325 lbf⋅ft) at 1,750–2,750 rpm	—	—

G70 Shooting Brake
Model	Years	Transmission	Power/rpm	Torque/rpm	Acceleration 0–100 km/h (0–62 mph) (official)	Top Speed
Gasoline
Theta II 2.0 T-GDi	2021–present	8-speed automatic	197 PS (145 kW; 194 hp) at 4,500–6,200 rpm	36 kg⋅m (353 N⋅m; 260 lbf⋅ft) at 1,450–3,500 rpm	9.3 s (RWD)	218 km/h (135 mph)
Theta II 2.0 T-GDi	2021–present	8-speed automatic	245 PS (180 kW; 242 hp) at 6,200 rpm	36 kg⋅m (353 N⋅m; 260 lbf⋅ft) at 1,450–3,500 rpm	6.4 s (RWD); 6.9 s (AWD)	235 km/h (146 mph)
Theta II 2.0 T-GDi	2022–2023 (South Korea)	8-speed automatic	252 PS (185 kW; 249 hp) at 6,200 rpm 255 PS (188 kW; 252 hp) at 6,200 rpm	36 kg⋅m (353 N⋅m; 260 lbf⋅ft) at 1,400–4,000 rpm	—	—
Smartstream G2.5 T-GDi	2023–present	8-speed automatic	304 PS (224 kW; 300 hp) at 5,800 rpm	43 kg⋅m (422 N⋅m; 311 lbf⋅ft) at 1,650–4,000 rpm	—	—
Diesel
R II 2.2 CRDi	2021–present (Europe)	8-speed automatic	200 PS (147 kW; 197 hp) at 3,800 rpm	45 kg⋅m (441 N⋅m; 325 lbf⋅ft) at 1,750–2,750 rpm	7.7 s (RWD); 8.2 s (AWD)	225 km/h (140 mph)

== Safety ==
The 2019 Genesis G70 was awarded "Top Safety Pick+" by the IIHS.

IIHS scores (2019)
Category	Rating	
Small overlap front: driver-side	Good	
Small overlap front: passenger-side	Good	
Moderate overlap front: original test	Good	
Side: original test	Good	
Roof strength	Good (Note: Strength-to-weight ratio: 5.53)	
Head restraints & seats	Good	
Headlights (varies by trim/option)	Good	Poor
Front crash prevention: vehicle-to-vehicle	Superior	
Front crash prevention: pedestrian (day)	Advanced	
LATCH ease of use	Marginal	

Euro NCAP test results for a LHD, five door shooting brake variant on a registration from 2021:

Test	Score	%
Overall:	5/5 stars	
Adult occupant:	34	89%
Child occupant:	43	87%
Vulnerable road users:	41.3	76%
Safety assist:	14.1	88%

ANCAP test results Genesis G70 (2018, aligned with Euro NCAP)
Test	Points	%
Overall:	5 /5 stars	
Adult occupant:	30.9	81%
Child occupant:	42.5	86%
Pedestrian:	33.5	69%
Safety assist:	10.6	81%

== Awards ==
- Best Luxury Sedan for 2019 – Ruedas ESPN (10/18)
- 2019 Car of the Year – MotorTrend (11/18)
- 10Best list – Car and Driver (11/18)
- Best Deluxe Car – Hispanic Motor Press (11/18)
- IIHS Top Safety Pick + (12/18)
- North American Car of the Year – Detroit Auto Show (01/19)
- 2019 Car of the Year – AutoGuide (01/19)
- Shift Award – 2019 Vehicle of the Year – Roadshow by CNET (01/19)
- Overall Best of 2019 – Cars.com (02/19)
- 2019 Driver's Choice – Best Luxury Car – MotorWeek (02/19)
- 2019 Sport Sedan of the Year – Esquire (03/19)
- 2019 Best New Car – Autotrader (04/19)
- 2019 Sedan of the Year – Popular Mechanics (04/19)
- 2019 Best New Car – Luxury Sedan – Good Housekeeping (04/19)
- 2019 10 Best Interior – Ward's Auto (05/19)
- 2019 Best Panoramic Sunroof Sedan – Southern Automotive Media Association's (05/19)
- 2019 Best Winter Sedan – New England Motor Press Association (05/19)
- 2020 Best New Family Car Award Winner – Luxury Sedan – Good Housekeeping (04/20)

== Sales ==
Sales figures are compiled from different reporting systems and may not be directly comparable across markets. South Korean and global figures are reported on a wholesale basis, while some country-level figures are based on manufacturer-reported retail sales or terminal-sales data.

G70
Year	South Korea	United States	Canada	China	Global
2017	4,345	—N/a	—N/a	—N/a	4,389
2018	14,417	409	967	—N/a	28,216
2019	16,975	11,901	1,119	—N/a	28,181
2020	7,910	9,436	1,173	—N/a	16,248
2021	7,429	10,718	1,160		19,937
2022	5,284	12,649	1,129		19,624
2023	3,932	13,246	1,019		21,023
2024	2,181	12,258	818	161	15,962
2025	1,775	10,863	595	60	13,036

G70 SB
Year	South Korea	United States	Canada	Global
2022	803	—N/a	—N/a	901
2023	388	—N/a	—N/a	571
2024	180	—N/a	—N/a	301
2025	90	—N/a	—N/a	143
