= ICPS =

ICPS may refer to:

- International Carnivorous Plant Society
- The International Conference on the Physics of Semiconductors
- International Conference of Physics Students
- International Centre for Parliamentary Studies, UK
- Interim Cryogenic Propulsion Stage, a modified Delta Cryogenic Second Stage used as the second stage on the Block 1 SLS
- In-Car Payment System

== See also ==
- ICP (disambiguation)
