= North American Car of the Year =

Automotive award

The North American Car, Utility and Truck of the Year are a set of automotive awards announced at a news conference each January at the North American International Auto Show in Detroit. The jury consists of no more than 60 automotive journalists from the US and Canada.

== History ==
In 2016, a board of directors was created and the award became a 501 6(c) corporation. The new Board consists of: Mark Phelan, President; Matt DeLorenzo, Vice President; and Lauren Fix, Secretary / Treasurer.

For 2017 a new category was added to this award: Utility, with the Chrysler Pacifica the first winner.

== List of nominees and winners ==
For each award and year, the winner is shown at the top in bold, with the other finalists in italics in a bulleted list below.

=== 1994–1999 ===
Year	Car	Truck	Ref
1994	**Mercedes-Benz C-Class**: Chevrolet Camaro; Toyota Supra	**Dodge Ram**: Chevrolet S-10; GMC Sonoma; Land Rover Discovery	
1995	**Chrysler Cirrus**: Ford Contour; Oldsmobile Aurora	**Chevrolet Blazer**: Ford Explorer; Ford Windstar	
1996	**Chrysler minivans**: Ford Taurus/Mercury Sable; Mercedes-Benz E-Class	**Ford F-150**: GMC Yukon/Chevrolet Tahoe; Land Rover Range Rover	
1997	**Mercedes-Benz SLK-Class**: Jaguar XK8; BMW 5 Series	**Ford Expedition**: Dodge Dakota; Toyota RAV4	
1998	**Chevrolet Corvette**: Audi A6; Lexus GS	**Mercedes-Benz M-Class**: Dodge Durango; Subaru Forester	
1999	**Volkswagen New Beetle**: Honda Odyssey; Chrysler 300M	**Jeep Grand Cherokee**: Chevrolet Silverado; GMC Sierra	

=== 2000–2016 ===
Year	Car	Truck	Ref
2000	**Ford Focus**: Audi TT; Lincoln LS	**Nissan Xterra**: Dodge Dakota; Toyota Tundra	
2001	**Chrysler PT Cruiser**: Honda Insight; Toyota Prius	**Acura MDX**: Ford Escape; Toyota Sequoia	
2002	**Nissan Altima**: Ford Thunderbird; Cadillac CTS	**Chevrolet TrailBlazer**: Chevrolet Avalanche; Jeep Liberty	
2003	**Mini Cooper**: Infiniti G35; Nissan 350Z	**Volvo XC90**: Hummer H2; Honda Element; Nissan Murano	
2004	**Toyota Prius**: Mazda RX-8; Cadillac XLR	**Ford F-150**: Nissan Titan; Cadillac SRX	
2005	**Chrysler 300**: Chevrolet Corvette; Ford Mustang	**Ford Escape Hybrid**: Ford Freestyle; Land Rover LR3	
2006	**Honda Civic**: Ford Fusion; Pontiac Solstice	**Honda Ridgeline**: Ford Explorer; Nissan Xterra	
2007	**Saturn Aura**: Toyota Camry; Honda Fit	**Chevrolet Silverado**: Ford Edge; Mazda CX-7	
2008	**Chevrolet Malibu**: Cadillac CTS; Honda Accord	**Mazda CX-9**: Chevrolet Tahoe Hybrid; Buick Enclave	
2009	**Hyundai Genesis**: Ford Flex; Volkswagen Jetta TDI	**Ford F-150**; Dodge Ram; Mercedes-Benz ML320 BlueTEC	
2010	**Ford Fusion** **Hybrid**: Buick LaCrosse; Volkswagen Golf	**Ford Transit Connect**: Chevrolet Equinox; Subaru Outback	
2011	**Chevrolet Volt**: Hyundai Sonata; Nissan Leaf	**Ford Explorer**: Dodge Durango; Jeep Grand Cherokee	
2012	**Hyundai Elantra**: Ford Focus; Volkswagen Passat	**Land Rover Range Rover Evoque**: BMW X3; Honda CR-V	
2013	**Cadillac ATS** Ford Fusion; Honda Accord	**Ram 1500**	
2014	**Chevrolet Corvette Stingray**	**Chevrolet Silverado**	
2015	**Volkswagen Golf Mk7**	**Ford F-150**	
2016	**Honda Civic**	**Volvo XC90**	

=== 2017–present ===
Beginning with the 2017 awards, the Truck of the Year category was divided, creating a new Utility Vehicle of the Year category.

Year	Car	Utility	Truck	Ref
**2017**	**Chevrolet Bolt**: Genesis G90; Volvo S90	**Chrysler Pacifica**: Jaguar F-Pace*; Mazda CX-9*	**Honda Ridgeline**: Ford F Super Duty; Nissan Titan	
**2018**	**Honda Accord**: Kia Stinger*; Toyota Camry*	**Volvo XC60***: Alfa Romeo Stelvio; Honda Odyssey	**Lincoln Navigator**: Chevrolet Colorado ZR2; Ford Expedition	
**2019**	**Genesis G70***: Honda Insight; Volvo S60/V60*	**Hyundai Kona**: Acura RDX; Jaguar I-Pace*	**Ram 1500**: Chevrolet Silverado; GMC Sierra	
**2020**	**Chevrolet Corvette**: Hyundai Sonata*; Toyota Supra	**Kia Telluride***: Hyundai Palisade; Lincoln Aviator	**Jeep Gladiator**: Ford Ranger; RAM Heavy Duty	
**2021**	**Hyundai Elantra**: Genesis G80; Nissan Sentra	**Ford Mustang Mach-E***: Genesis GV80; Land Rover Defender	**Ford F-150**: Jeep Gladiator Mojave; Ram TRX	
**2022**	**Honda Civic**: Lucid Air; Volkswagen Golf R/GTI	**Ford Bronco**: Hyundai Ioniq 5; Genesis GV70	**Ford Maverick**: Rivian R1T; Hyundai Santa Cruz	
**2023**	**Acura Integra**: Genesis Electrified G80; Nissan Z	**Kia EV6**: Cadillac Lyriq; Genesis GV60	**Ford F-150 Lightning**: Chevrolet Silverado ZR2; Lordstown Endurance	
**2024**	**Toyota Prius**/**Prius Prime**: Honda Accord; Hyundai Ioniq 6	**Kia EV9***: Genesis Electrified GV70; Hyundai Kona/Kona EV*	**Ford Super Duty**: Chevrolet Colorado; Chevrolet Silverado EV	
**2025**	**Honda Civic Hybrid**: Kia K4; Toyota Camry	**Volkswagen ID. Buzz**: Chevrolet Equinox EV; Hyundai Santa Fe	**Ford Ranger**: Ram 1500; Toyota Tacoma	
2026	**Dodge Charger**: Honda Prelude; Nissan Sentra	**Hyundai Palisade**: Lucid Gravity; Nissan Leaf	**Ford Maverick Lobo**: Ram 1500; Ram Heavy Duty (fifth generation)	

*Vehicle was nominated for World Car of the Year; underlining indicates the vehicle won.

== See also ==
- List of motor vehicle awards
