= ICP =

ICP may refer to:

== Arts and entertainment ==
- Instant Composers Pool - Dutch free jazz musical cooperative
- Insane Clown Posse - American hip hop duo
- International Center of Photography - photography museum and school on the Lower East Side of Manhattan, New York City, USA.

== Businesses and organisations ==
=== Businesses ===
- ICP srl, Italian aerospace and automotive manufacturer
- International Comfort Products, an American air conditioning and heating company
- Imperial College Press, a British publishing house

=== Education ===
- Catholic University of Paris (Institut Catholique de Paris), France
- Clodomiro Picado Research Institute (Instituto Clodomiro Picado), a research center in Costa Rica
- International College Program, a Disney International Program

=== Politics ===
- Immigration Control Platform, a political group in Ireland
- Indochinese Communist Party, 1930–1945, a predecessor of the Communist Party of Vietnam
- International Communist Party, the name of a number of left communist international political parties
- Iraqi Communist Party

=== Other organisations ===
- Institute for Conflict Transformation and Peacebuilding, a Swiss non-governmental organization
- Instituto de Cultura Puertorriqueña ('Institute of Puerto Rican Culture')
- International Center of Photography, a museum in New York City, US
- International Comparison Program, a partnership of statistical administrations guided by the World Bank

== Science and technology ==
- ICP license (Internet Content Provider license), a permit to permit China-based websites to operate in China
- Inductively coupled plasma, a type of plasma source
- Initial Connection Protocol, of the ARPANET Network Control Program
- Integrated circuit piezoelectric sensor, a piezoelectric sensor
- International Cataloguing Principles, bibliographical cataloging standards for libraries
- Internet Cache Protocol, for coordinating web caches
- Intracranial pressure, inside the skull
- Intrahepatic cholestasis of pregnancy
- Intrinsically conducting polymer, organic polymers that conduct electricity
- Iterative closest point, a point cloud registration algorithm

== Other uses ==
- Indonesian Crude Price, a price index for crude oil from Indonesia.
