= Indonesian Crude Price =

Price index for crude oil

Indonesian Crude Price, or ICP, is a price index for crude oil from Indonesia.

The ICP is determined by Dirjen Migas, based on moving average spot price of a basket of eight internationally traded Indonesia crudes:

- Minas
- Cinta
- Duri
- Arjuna
- Attaka
- Widuri
- Belida
- Senipah

In some cases ICP is used as index in long term LNG contracts in East Asia.
