= In-Car Payment System =

System where payment can be made from inside the vehicle

In-Car Payment System (ICPS) is a system where payment can be made from inside the vehicle. This is done through wireless communication between vehicle-affiliate-card companies.

== Current Situation ==
=== Hyundai Motors ===
Hyundai Motors developed 'Car Pay' as an in-car payment system platform and first installed it on the Genesis GV80, released on January 15, 2020. Since then, it has been a basic option in vehicles such as the 7th generation All-New Avante, which was released on April 7, 2020, and more. Car pay can be paid by touching the navigation screen when payment is needed, such as parking lots and gas stations.

=== Renault Samsung Motors ===
Renault Samsung Motors first installed an in-car payment system on its 2022 XM3, released on June 4, 2021. It will be available at convenience stores, gas stations, parking lots, cafes and restaurants from July 2021. It is the only in-car payment system that can request the ordered menu to be delivered to the vehicle.

=== Jaguar ===
On February 14, 2017, Jaguar launched the world's first gas payment system. Since April 2015, payment can be made using an application in vehicles such as Jaguar XE, Jaguar XF, and Jaguar F-PACE.

=== Credit Card Companies ===
In 2016, Mastercard partnered with General Motors and IBM for the ICPS system. As a result, passengers were allowed to make payments using credit and debit Mastercards. In January 2019, Vista and SiriusXM Connected Vehicles Services also launched the SiriusXM e-wallet. This allowed drivers to make payments using their Visa account and authenticate using biometric authentication such as voice and touchscreen commands.

=== CarIQPay ===
Working with Visa CitiGroup, BlackBerry with QNX already in few 100sM cars, CarIQPay has started to roll-out since 2022 InCar Payment for Vehicle fleets. On CES show in 2023 and live in the street at CES 2024, the system already proposes a frictionless experience for Fuelling/Charging, Tolling and Parking payment with an extensive network of merchants acceptance throughout the USA.

== See also ==
- Mobile payment
- Infotainment
- Vehicle
