= Genesis G80 =

Executive car

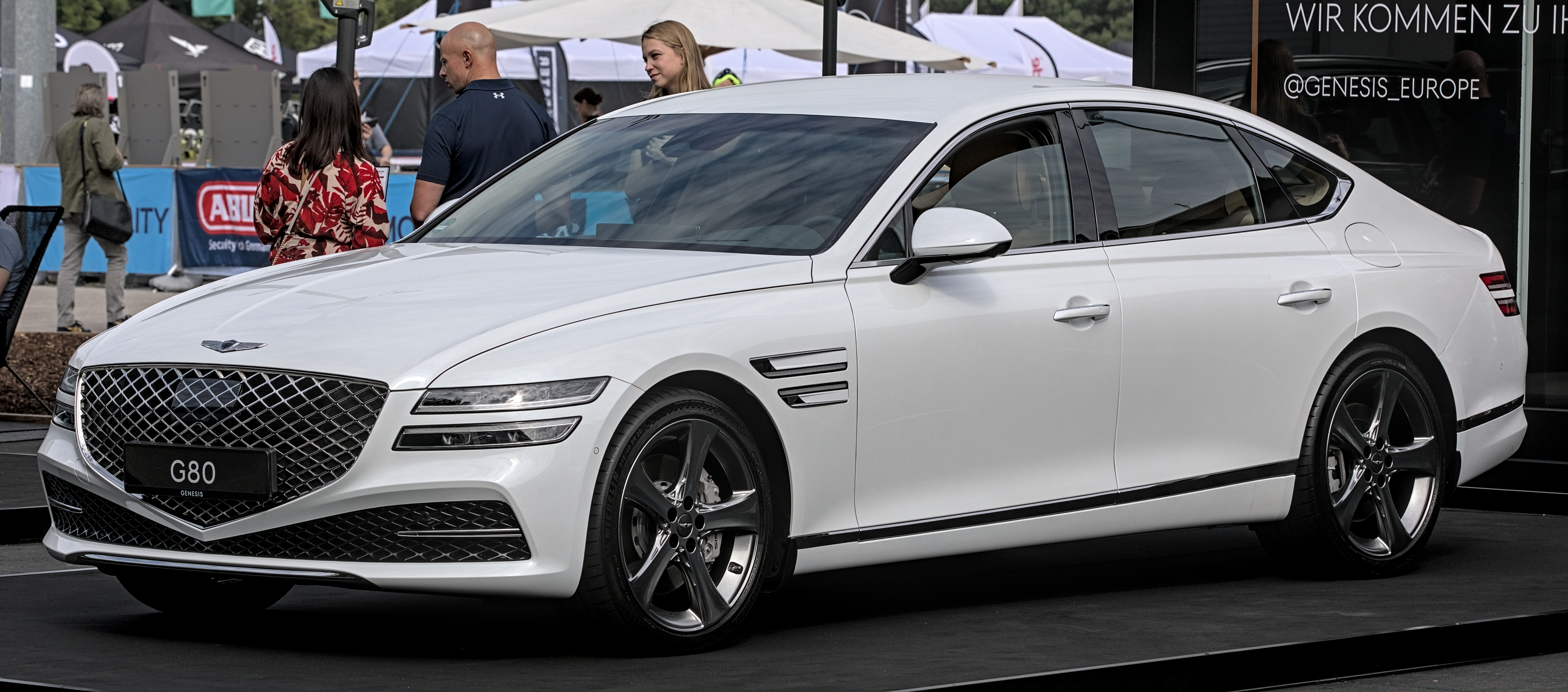
- 2021 Genesis G80 (RG3)

Overview
- Manufacturer: Genesis Motor (Hyundai)
- Production: 2016–present; (2008–2016 as the Hyundai Genesis)
- Model years: 2017–present

Body and chassis
- Class: Executive car (E)
- Body style: 4-door sedan

Chronology
- Predecessor: Hyundai Genesis

The Genesis G80 (Korean: 제네시스 G80) is an executive sedan manufactured by South Korean luxury marque Genesis, which is owned by Hyundai Motor Company. The G80 model was previously introduced as the second-generation Hyundai Genesis model (DH) and then rebranded as the G80 in 2016 after Genesis Motor was established as a separate luxury division of Hyundai.

== First generation (DH; 2016) ==
First generation
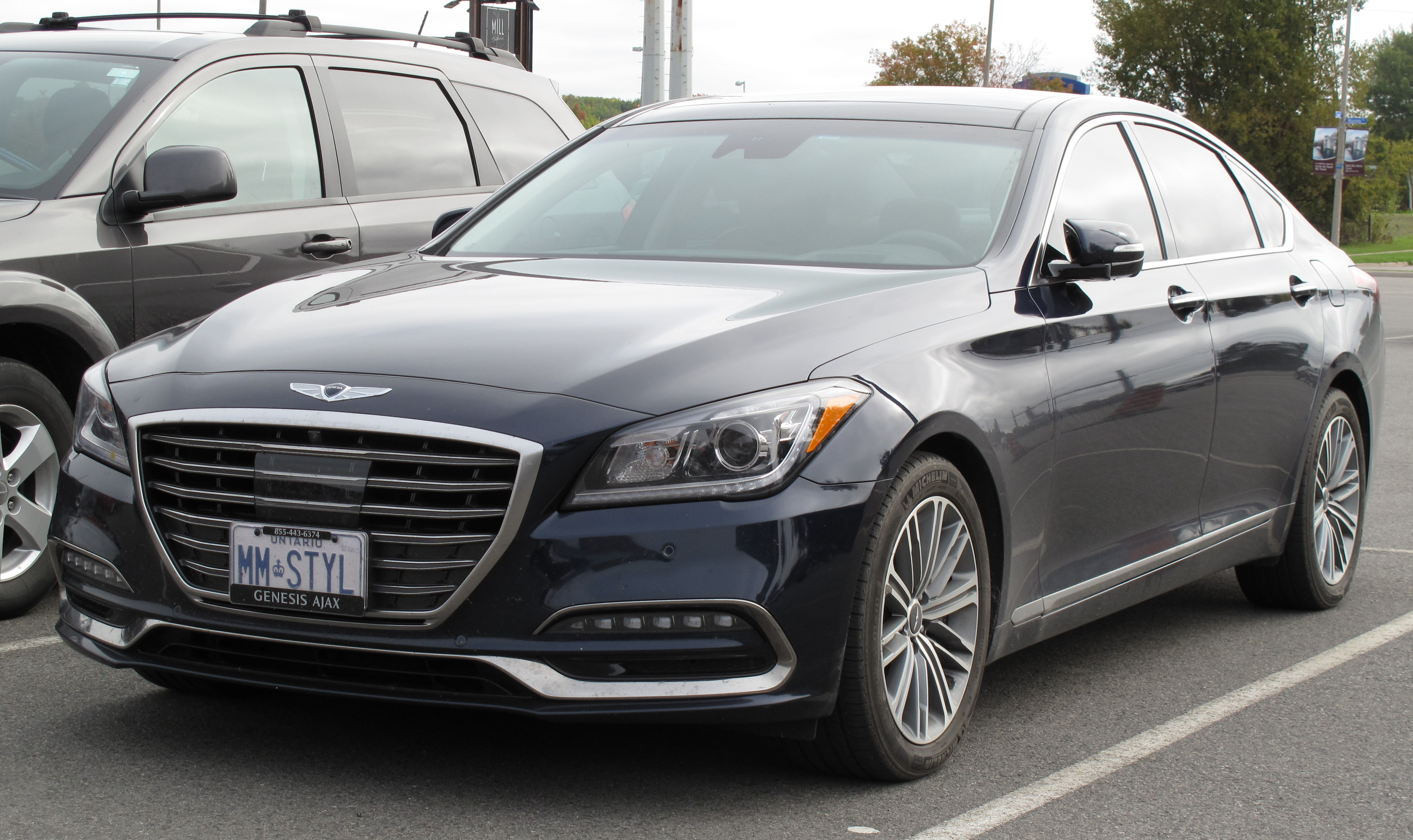

Overview
- Model code: DH
- Production: March 2016 – 2020
- Model years: 2017–2020
- Assembly: South Korea: Ulsan (Hyundai Motors Ulsan Plant); Russia: Kaliningrad (Avtotor)
- Designer: Kim Ki-Euk (Sport)

Body and chassis
- Layout: Front-engine, rear-wheel-drive; Front-engine, all-wheel-drive
- Platform: Hyundai M2
- Related: Genesis G90; Kia K9

Powertrain
- Engine: Gasoline: 2.0 L Theta II T-GDI I4; 3.3 L Lambda II GDI V6; 3.3 L Lambda II T-GDI V6; 3.8 L Lambda II GDI V6; 5.0 L Tau GDI V8; Diesel: 2.2 L R II CRDi I4
- Transmission: 8-speed automatic

Dimensions
- Wheelbase: 3,010 mm (118.5 in)
- Length: 4,990 mm (196.5 in)
- Width: 1,890 mm (74.4 in)
- Height: 1,480 mm (58.3 in)
- Curb weight: 1,900–2,005 kg (4,189–4,420 lb) (3.3); 1,965–2,035 kg (4,332–4,486 lb) (3.8); 2,020–2,090 kg (4,453–4,608 lb) (3.3T); 1,950–2,065 kg (4,299–4,553 lb) (2.2D)

The vehicle debuted as the updated version of the Hyundai Genesis at the 2016 North American International Auto Show, followed by the 2016 Busan Motor Show. South Korean models went on sale in July 2016 with US models selling in September 2016 as a 2017 model year vehicle. Powertrains available included 3.8, 3.8 HTRAC, 5.0, and 5.0 HTRAC. The Russian market release in 2017 included a 2.0-liter Theta turbocharged engine that produced 180 kW (245 PS), eight-speed automatic and all-wheel drive.

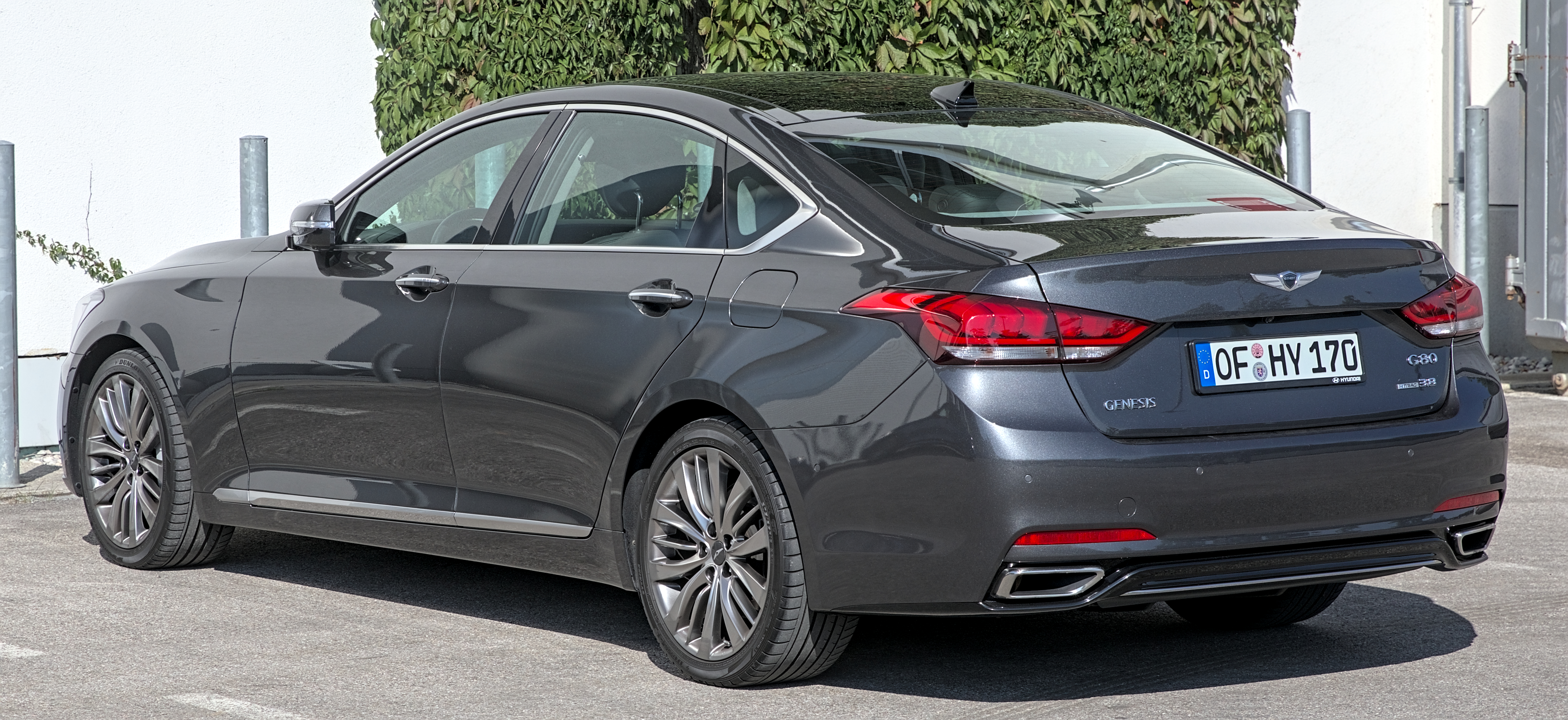
Rear

=== G80 Sport ===
The Genesis G80 Sport (2017–2020) has a twin-turbo 3.3-liter V6 engine producing 272 kW (370 PS), features sport-styled bumpers, quad-exhaust tips, staggered nineteen-inch wheels, copper tint accent chrome, copper leather stitching and a mesh grille. The vehicle also comes standard with the Ultimate trim, technology package, heads-up display, panoramic sunroof, suede liner and Napa leather. The vehicle debuted at the 2016 Busan Motor Show, followed by the 2016 Los Angeles Auto Show, and the 2017 North American International Auto Show. US models were sold as 2018, 2019, 2020 model year vehicles.

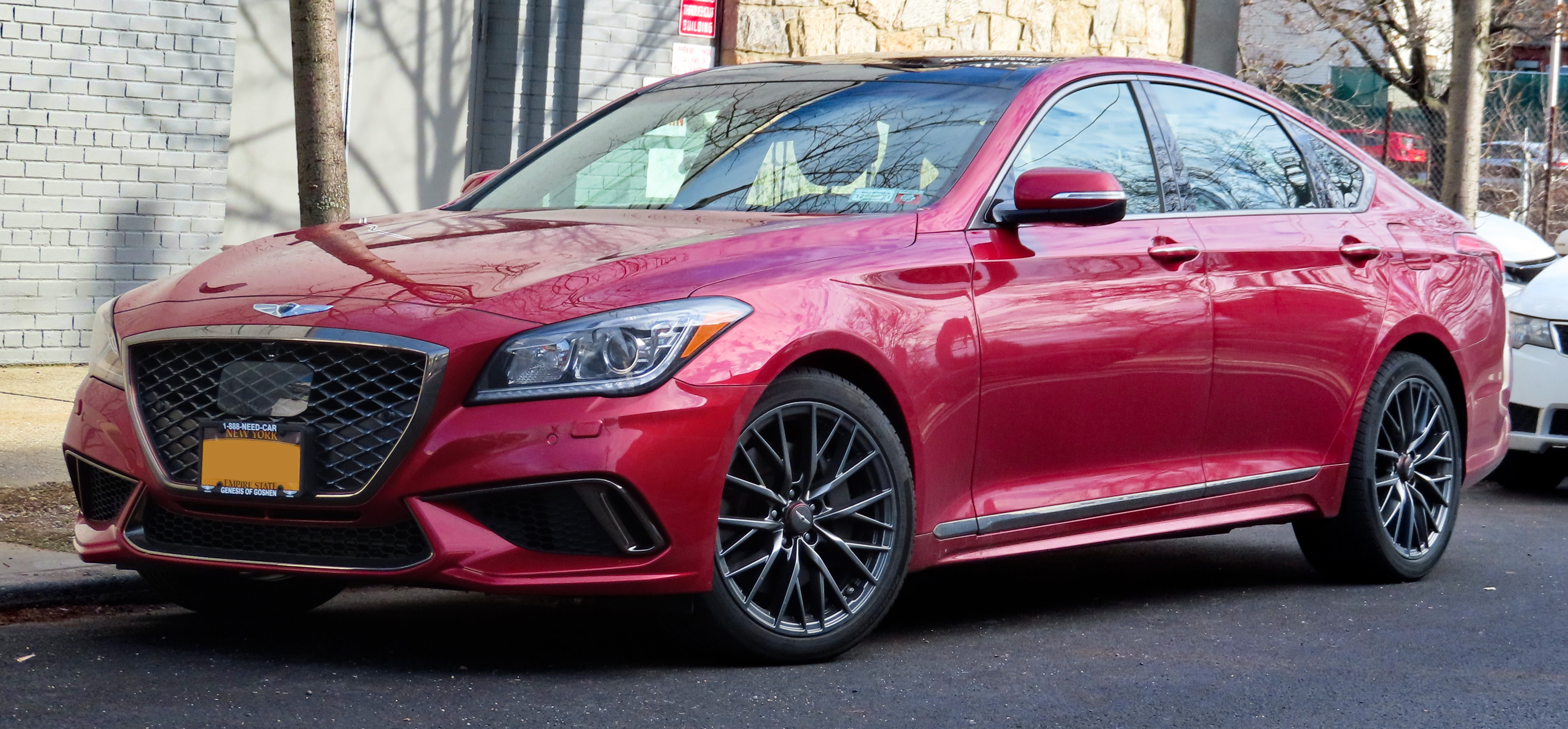
G80 3.8 HTRAC (front)

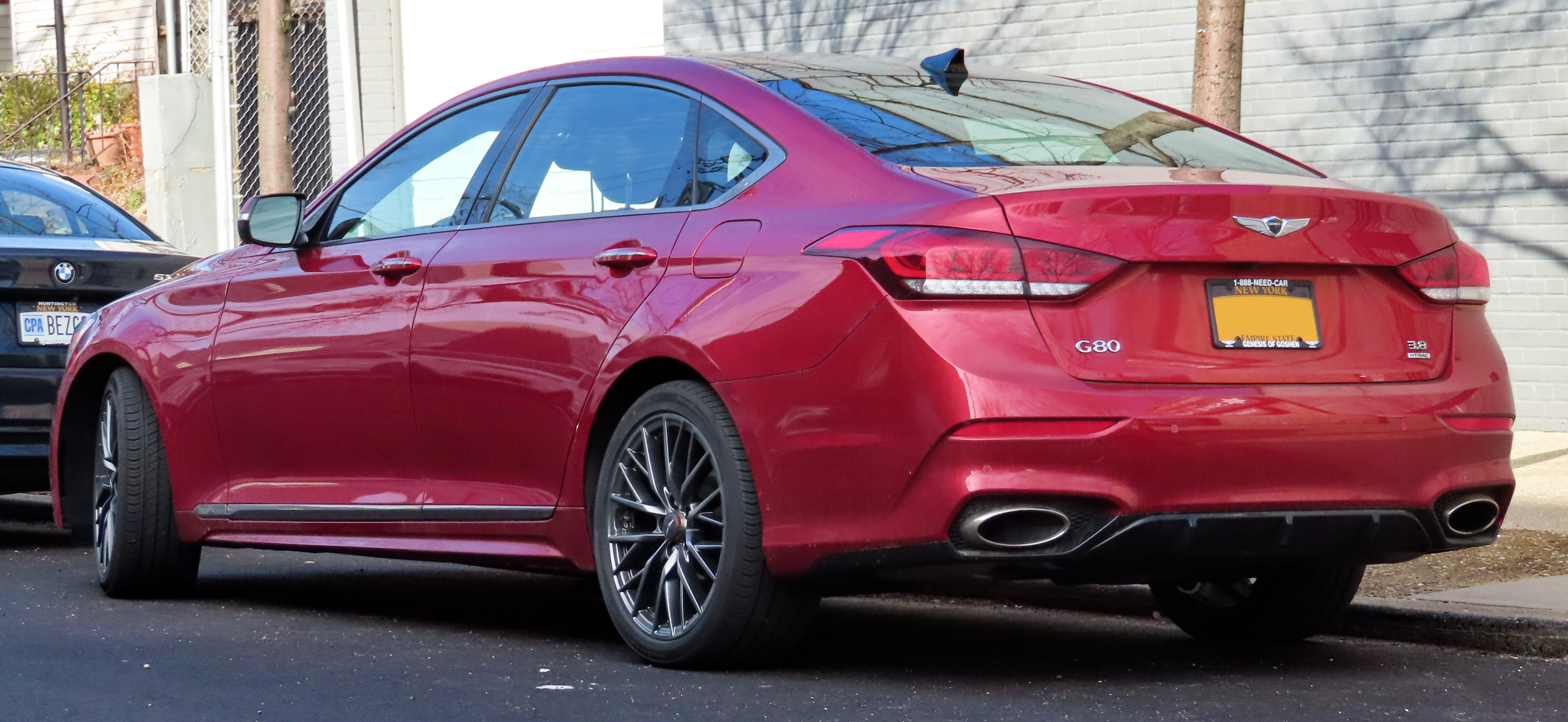
G80 3.8 HTRAC (back)

=== Engines ===
Model	Years	Type/code	Power@ rpm	Torque @ rpm	0–100 km/h (0–62 mph) (official)	Top speed
Gasoline
2.0 Theta II T-GDi	2017–2020	1,998 cc (121.9 cu in) I4 (G4KL)	245 PS (242 hp; 180 kW) @ 6,000 rpm	36 kg⋅m (353 N⋅m; 260 lbf⋅ft) @ 1,400–4,000 rpm	8.6s (AWD)	237 km/h (147 mph)
3.3 Lambda II GDi	2016–2020	3,342 cc (203.9 cu in) V6 (G6DH)	282 PS (278 hp; 207 kW) @ 6,000 rpm	35.4 kg⋅m (347 N⋅m; 256 lbf⋅ft) @ 5,000 rpm	7.2s (RWD)	
3.3 Lambda II T-GDi	2017–2020	3,342 cc (203.9 cu in) V6 (G6DP)	370 PS (365 hp; 272 kW) @ 6,000 rpm	52 kg⋅m (510 N⋅m; 376 lbf⋅ft) @ 1,300–4,500 rpm	5.9s (RWD); 6.2s (AWD)	250 km/h (155 mph)
3.8 Lambda II GDi	2016–2020	3,778 cc (230.5 cu in) V6 (G6DJ)	315 PS (311 hp; 232 kW) @ 6,000 rpm	40.5 kg⋅m (397 N⋅m; 293 lbf⋅ft) @ 5,000 rpm	6.5s (RWD); 6.8s (AWD)	240 km/h (149 mph)
5.0 Tau GDi	2016–2020	5,038 cc (307.4 cu in) V8 (G8BE)	413 PS (407 hp; 304 kW) @ 6,000 rpm (Regular); 426 PS (420 hp; 313 kW) @ 6,000 rpm (Premium)	51.5 kg⋅m (505 N⋅m; 373 lbf⋅ft) @ 5,000 rpm (Regular); 53 kg⋅m (520 N⋅m; 383 lbf⋅ft) @ 5,000 rpm (Premium)	5.4s (RWD)	
Diesel
2.2 R II CRDi	2018–2020	2,199 cc (134.2 cu in) I4 (D4HC)	203 PS (200 hp; 149 kW) @ 3,800 rpm	45 kg⋅m (441 N⋅m; 325 lbf⋅ft) @ 1,750–2,750 rpm		

=== Transmission ===
All models have an eight-speed automatic transmission with shiftronic. The G80 is available with rear-wheel drive or all-wheel drive (HTRAC).

=== Safety ===
2020 Genesis G80 NHTSA
Overall:	5/5 stars
Frontal driver:	5/5 stars
Frontal passenger:	5/5 stars
Side driver:	4/5 stars
Side passenger:	5/5 stars
Side pole driver:	4/5 stars
Rollover AWD:	9.50%

IIHS:
Category	Rating
Moderate overlap frontal offset	Good
Side impact	Good
Roof strength	Good (Note: Strength-to-weight ratio: 4.95)

ANCAP test results Genesis G80 (2014)
Test	Score
Overall	5 /5 stars
Frontal offset	15.88/16
Side impact	16/16
Pole	2/2
Seat belt reminders	3/3
Whiplash protection	Good
Pedestrian protection	Adequate
Electronic stability control	Standard

== Second generation (RG3; 2020) ==
Second generation
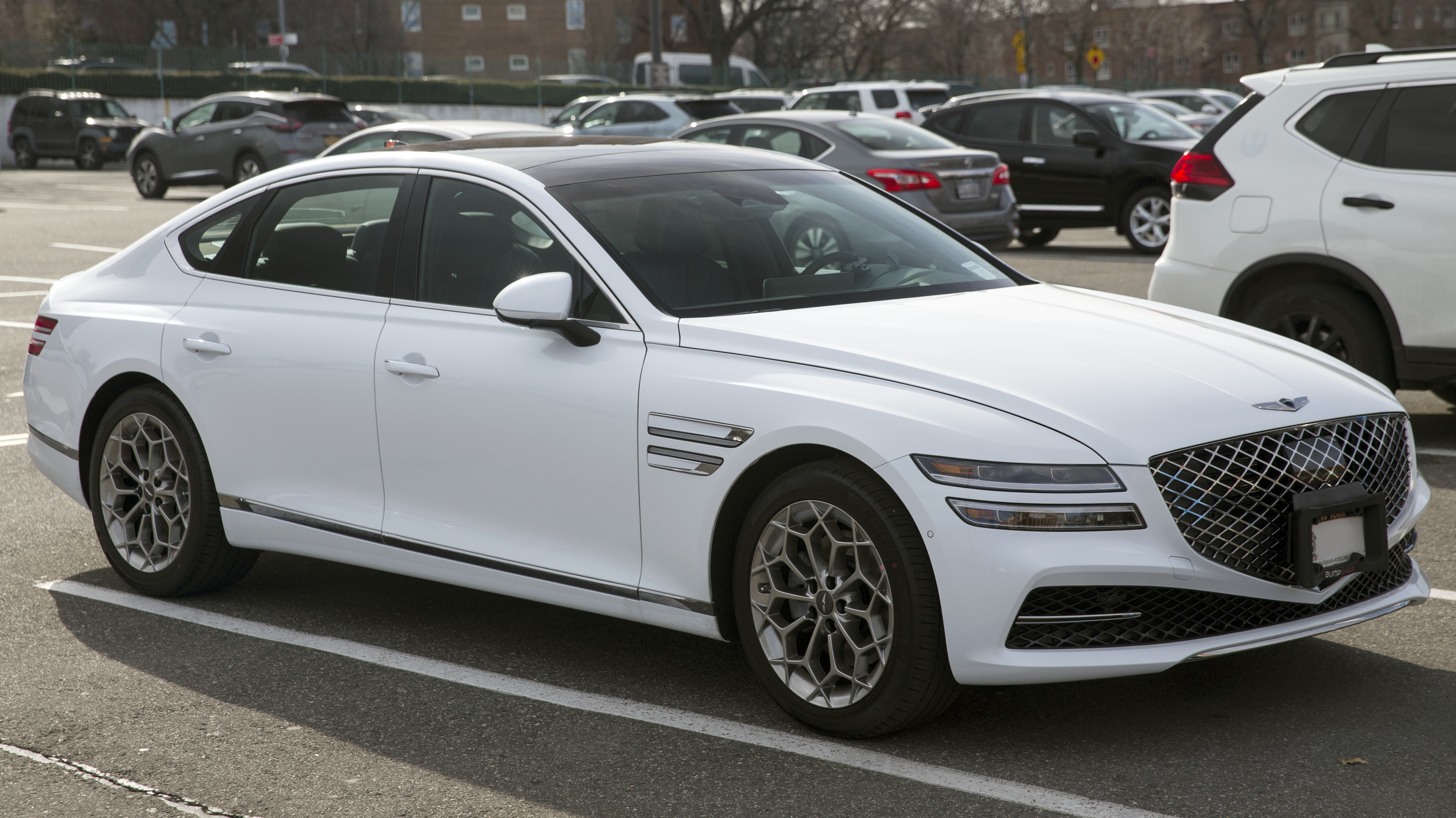
- 2021 G80 2.5T AWD (pre-facelift)

Overview
- Model code: RG3
- Also called: Genesis Electrified G80 (EV)
- Production: April 2020 – present
- Model years: 2021–present
- Assembly: South Korea: Ulsan (Hyundai Motors Ulsan Plant)
- Designer: Luc Donckerwolke

Body and chassis
- Layout: Front-engine, rear-wheel-drive; Front-engine, all-wheel-drive; Dual-motor, all-wheel-drive (Electrified G80)
- Platform: Hyundai-Kia M3
- Related: Genesis GV80

Powertrain
- Engine: Gasoline: 2.5 L Smartstream G2.5 T-GDi I4; 3.5 L Smartstream G3.5 T-GDi V6; Diesel: 2.2 L Smartstream D2.2 CRDi I4
- Electric motor: 2x Permanent Magnet Synchronous Motors (Electrified G80)
- Transmission: 8-speed A8LR1/A8TR1 automatic 1-speed reduction gear (Electrified G80)
- Battery: 87.2 kWh, 800 V (Electrified G80 pre-facelift); 95.4 kWh, 800 V (Electrified G80 facelift)
- Plug-in charging: 350 kW 800 V DC (Electrified G80); 11 kW AC (Electrified G80); V2L: 3.6 kW (Electrified G80)

Dimensions
- Wheelbase: 3,010 mm (118.5 in); 3,140 mm (123.6 in) (Electrified G80 facelift)
- Length: 4,995 mm (196.7 in) (G80 pre-facelift & G80 Sport); 5,005 mm (197.0 in) (G80 facelift & Electrified G80); 5,135 mm (202.2 in) (Electrified G80 facelift)
- Width: 1,925 mm (75.8 in)
- Height: 1,465 mm (57.7 in) (G80); 1,470–1,480 mm (57.9–58.3 in) (Electrified G80)
- Curb weight: 1,785–1,930 kg (3,935–4,255 lb) (2.5T); 1,890–2,035 kg (4,167–4,486 lb) (3.5T); 1,825–1,920 kg (4,023–4,233 lb) (2.2D); 2,265–2,355 kg (4,993–5,192 lb) (Electrified G80)

Internally designated RG3, the RG3 G80 resembles its SUV counterpart, including a large grille, similar front and rear fascias, as well as a similar interior. The vehicle is built upon the M3 platform, designated towards mid-size luxury vehicles that use a rear- or all-wheel drive basis.

=== Development and launch ===
The RG3 G80 was officially revealed via an online livestream on March 30, 2020, and went on sale in the US during the summer of that year. It is also considered the third-generation model of the original Hyundai Genesis as the first-generation G80 model was initially launched as the second-generation Hyundai Genesis model (DH) and later rebranded as the G80 in 2016 after Genesis Motor became a separate luxury division of Hyundai. There are three engine options – a 2.5-liter gasoline turbo engine, a 3.5-liter gasoline turbo engine, or a 2.2-liter diesel engine.

The brand claims 19 percent of the new platform uses aluminum, saving 243 lb (110 kg) compared to the previous model which used steel. Compared to the outgoing G80, the new model has increased tensile strength by 6 percent due to the usage of high-strength steel in both the A and B pillars, floor crossmembers and rocker panels. The rear subframe is more rigid and has larger bushings for decreased NVH (noise, vibration, and harshness). The torsional rigidity is improved by 3 percent, which deducts 55 lb (25 kg) of its weight.

The vehicle is 5 mm (0.20 in) longer, 35 mm (1.4 in) wider, 15 mm (0.59 in) lower, and retains its 3,010 mm (119 in) wheelbase.

The G80 had started its model years in the US in 2021. Trims consist of a 2.5T, 2.5T Advanced, a 2.5T Prestige, a 3.5T model, and a 3.5T Prestige. The Electrified model had arrived at the end of 2021.

=== Design ===
The design language of the Genesis includes quad-headlamps, and a large crest grille. The side profile features a parabolic line, and a fastback-type side view. The rear uses taillamp styling similar to the headlamps. The vehicle features Nappa leather seats. The vehicle also continues using Open Pore wood trim and has slim air conditioning vents. The horizontal layout of the dashboard was inspired by what the brand calls “Beauty of White Space”, which is Genesis’ interior styling design that is made to give the vehicle a "South Korean feel". There is also a glass covered SBW (shift-by-wire) transmission.

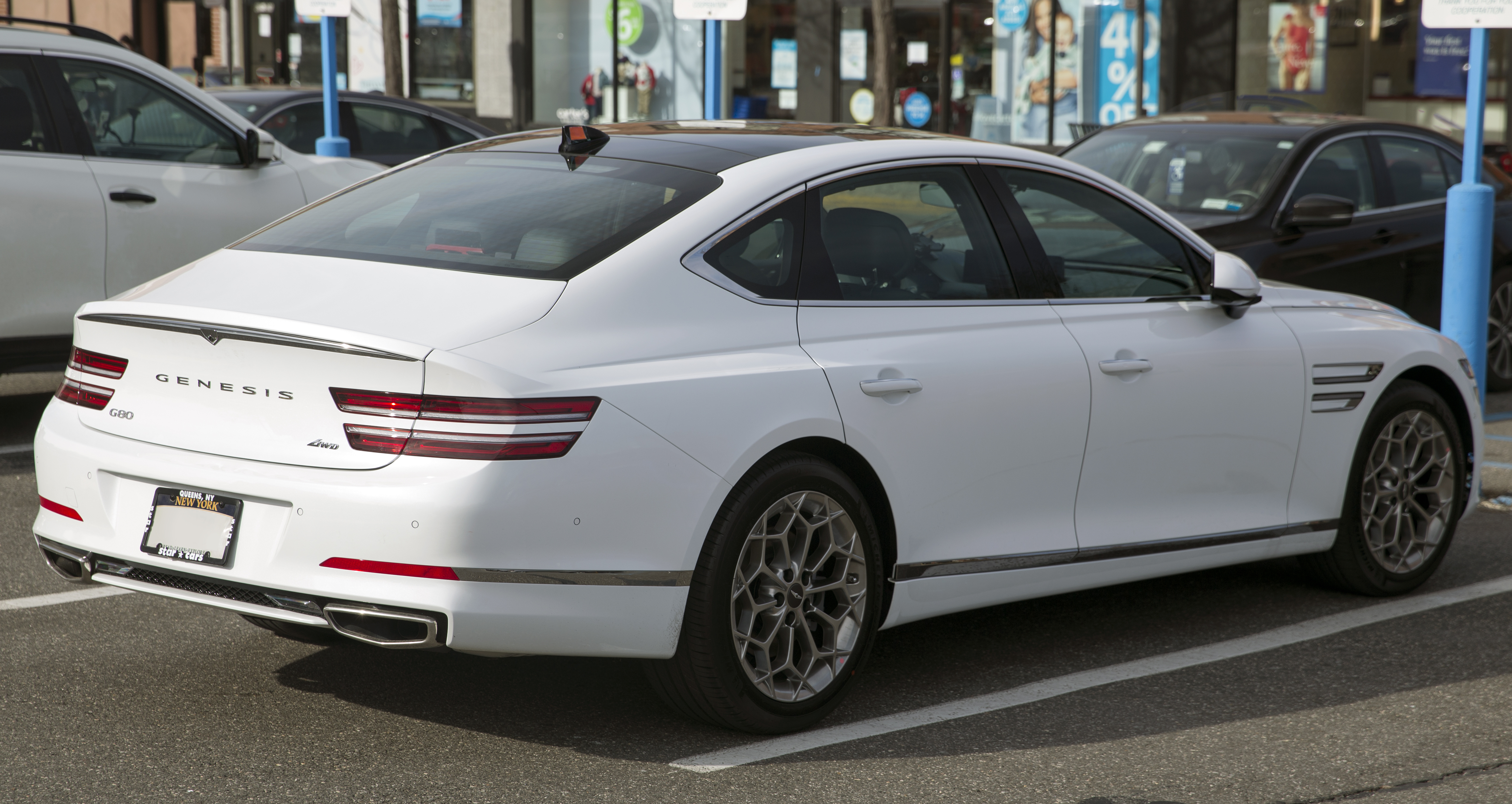
Rear view (pre-facelift)

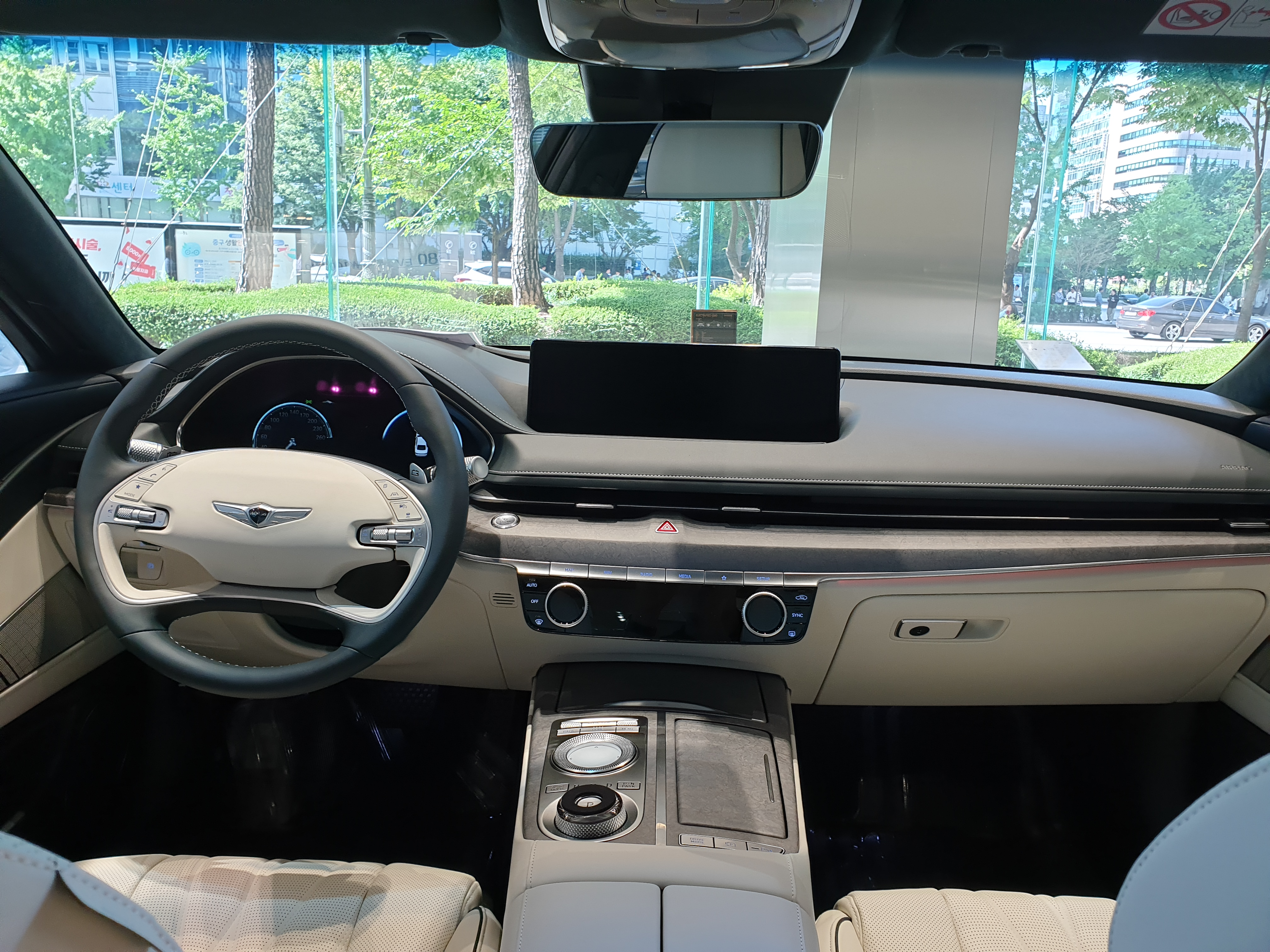
Interior (Electrified G80)

=== Facelift ===
Hyundai revealed the facelifted G80 on December 14, 2023, for the 2024 model year. Updates include micro-lens array headlight technology, a new grille pattern and front bumper, and redesigned alloy wheels. The rear bumper now features hidden exhaust outlets with "V-shape" chrome trim, reminiscent of the battery electric G80 variant. The interior changes include a 27-inch OLED display, replacing the separate 12.3-inch digital instrument cluster and 14.5-inch infotainment system, powering the brand's latest CCIC software first seen in the GV60 small SUV and flagship G90 sedan. It also introduces a "crystal-like" shift-by-wire gear shifter, a touch-based climate control panel, revised trim, and a new steering wheel. The G80 Sport adds a unique "double-layered G-Matrix pattern" grille, larger air outlets, different front and rear bumpers, a D-cut steering wheel, and two carbon-look interior garnishes. The updated G80 will be available in ten exterior colors, including the new Brooklyn Brown, and four interior color options.

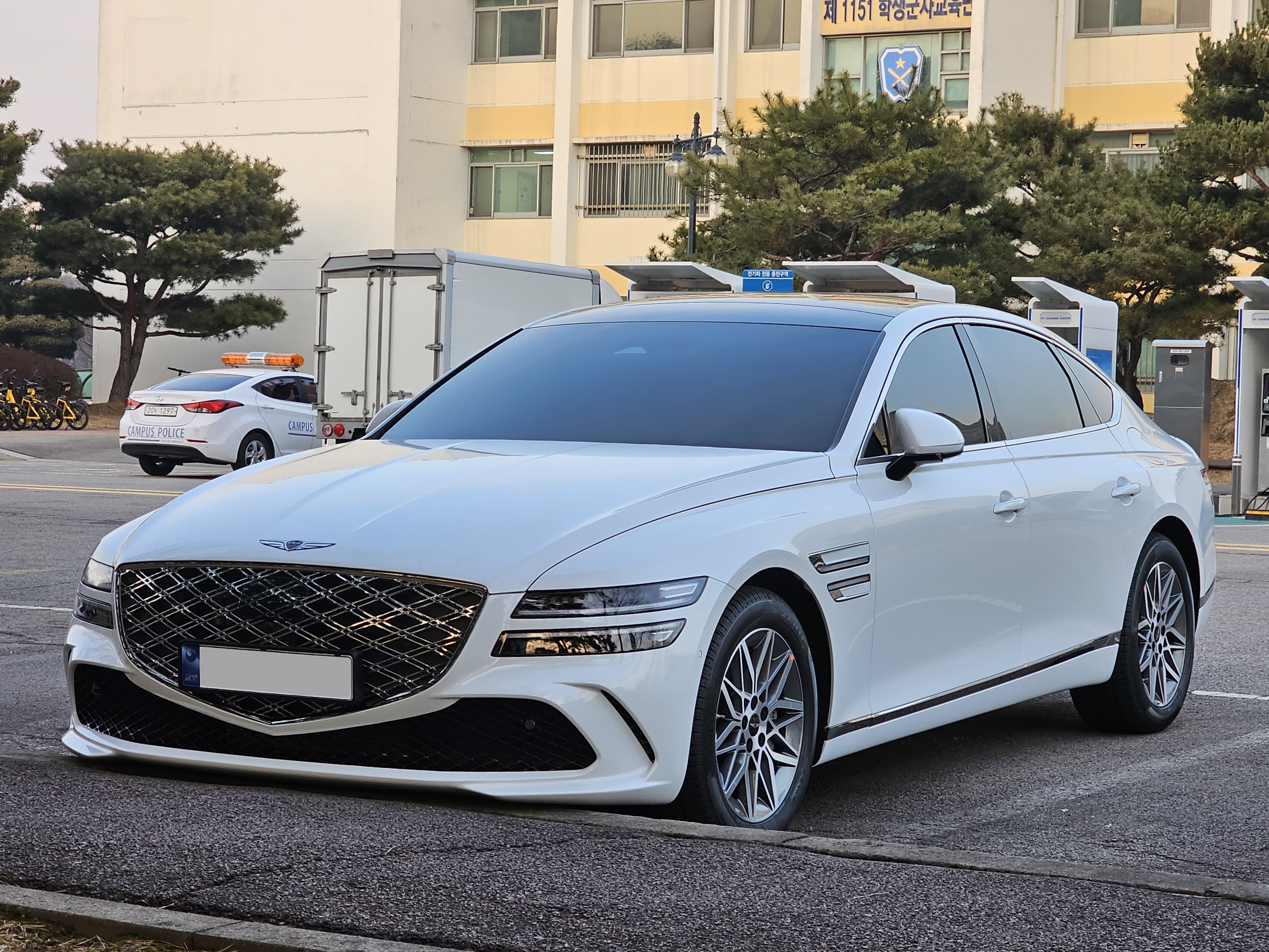
Front view (facelift)

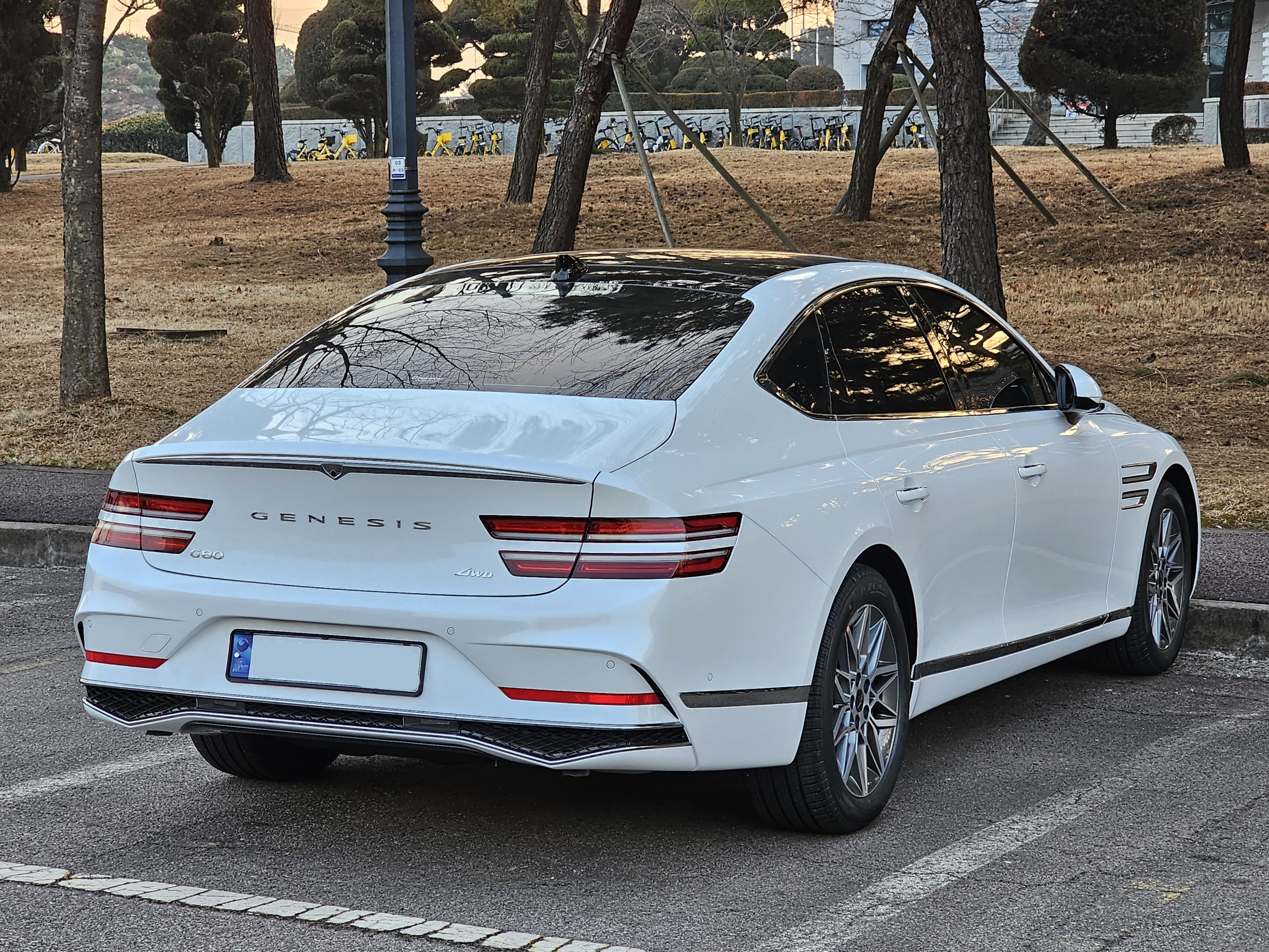
Rear view (facelift)

=== Electrified G80 ===
The Electrified G80 is the battery electric version of the G80. It debuted at the Shanghai Auto Show on 19 April 2021. It has been sold in South Korea since 2021.

It is available in a dual-motor, all-wheel drive configuration. It uses two electric motors (272 kW combined), one at each axle, and a 87.2 kWh battery. The vehicle can charge from 10% to 80% in 22 minutes, if a 350 kW charger is available. Just like the Ioniq 5, it has a vehicle-to-load (V2L) function, meaning that various appliances like laptops or electric bikes can be plugged into the car (instead of a wall socket) and use the car as their power source. The Electrified G80 can be equipped with an optional solar roof.

The interior contains recycled materials, including leather made with natural dye (seats, console and rear seat armrests), scrap wood produced after making furniture ("forged wood" garnish) and thread spun from plastic bottles. The Electrified G80 offers a Disconnector Actuator System (DAS), an Active Noise Control-Road (ANC-R) system, a Preview Electronic Control Suspension (Pre-view ECS), a solar charging roof, a Vehicle to Load (V2L) system and a 400/800V multi rapid charging system.

In the United States, the Electrified G80 went on sale in August 2022 for the 2023 model year. Initial sales were limited to the states of California, Connecticut, New Jersey, and New York, with four more states added the following month. The Electrified G80 sold very slowly in the United States; 140 examples were delivered in 2024, followed by 77 more units in the first half of 2025, and Genesis quietly discontinued the car in August 2025.

The long wheelbase version of the Electrified G80 was used as the official VIP car for participating leaders and delegates at the 2022 G20 Summit in Bali, Indonesia with the wheelbase extended to 3,227 mm (127.0 in) and overall length to 5,222 mm (205.6 in).

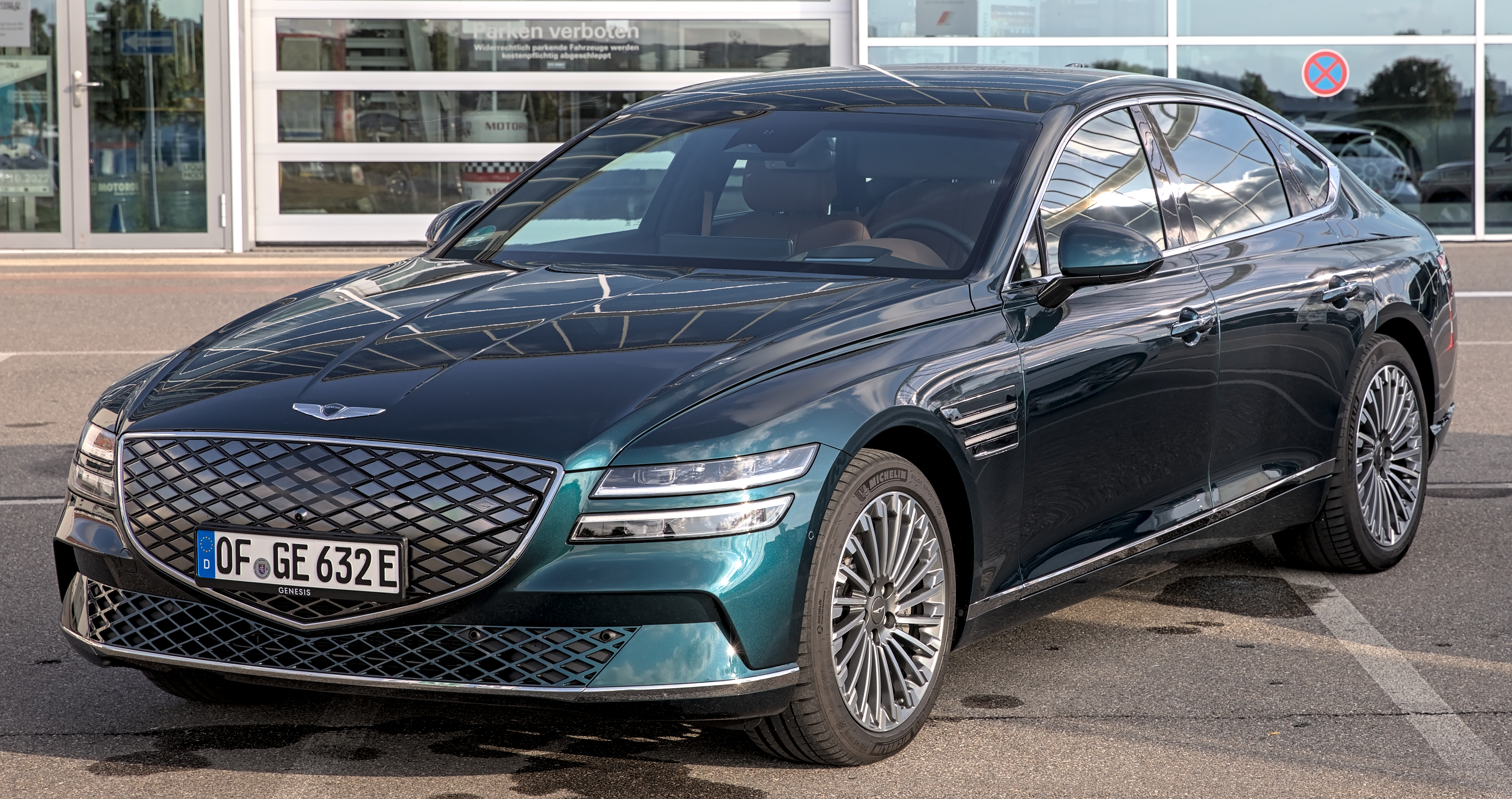
Electrified G80 (pre-facelift)

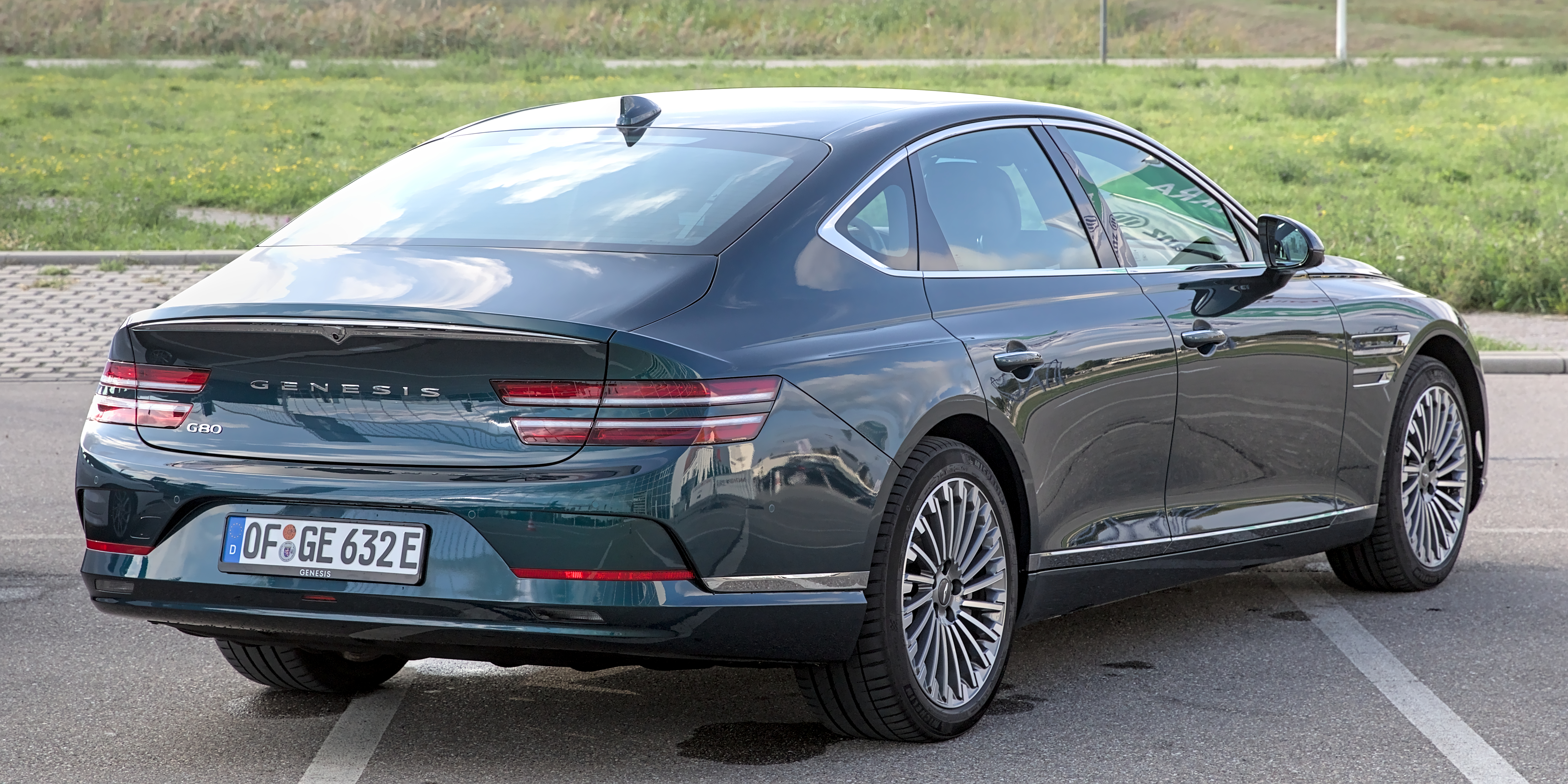
Rear view (pre-facelift)

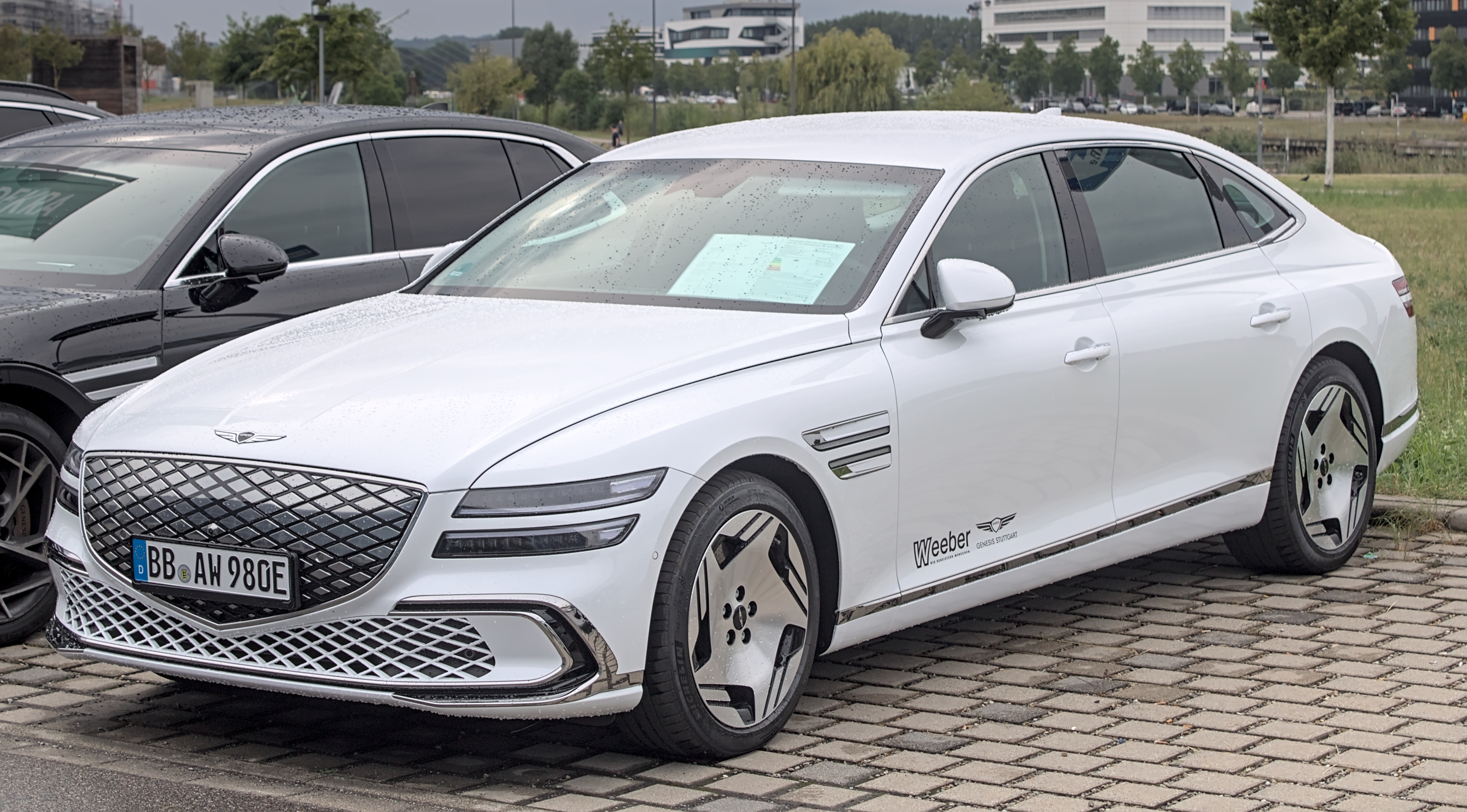
Electrified G80 (facelift)

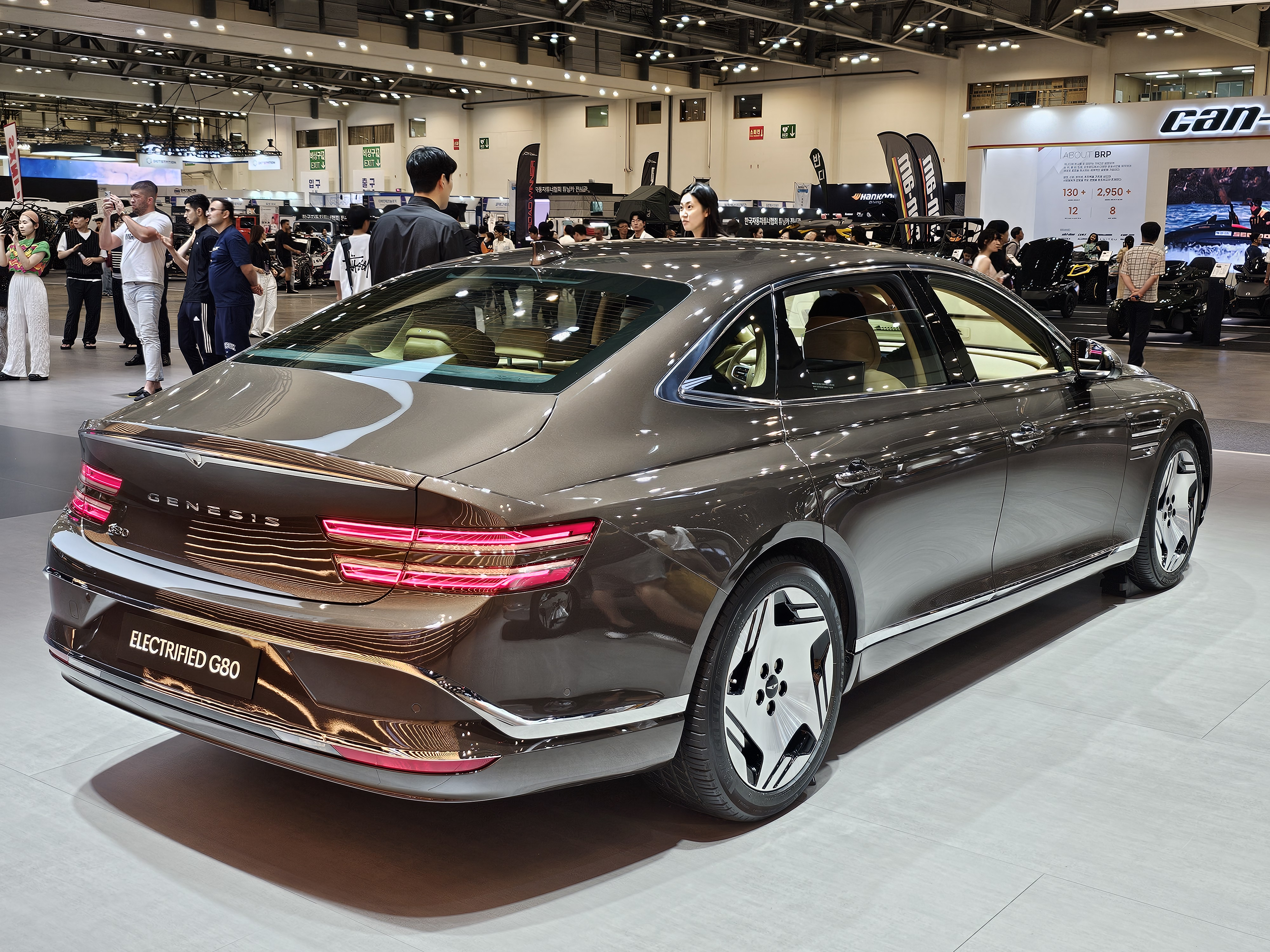
Rear view (facelift)

=== G80 Sport ===
After the design release on July 5, 2021, the Genesis G80 Sport was released on August 10, 2021. This model introduced redesigned grills, bumpers, headlamps and wheels compared to the non-Sport model. A Cavendish Red paint color is exclusive for the G80 sports model. Two gasoline engines and a diesel are available.

The G80 Sport is also equipped with Rear Wheel Steering (RWS) system, a technology that actively controls the optimal rear-wheel steering angle along with front-wheel steering.

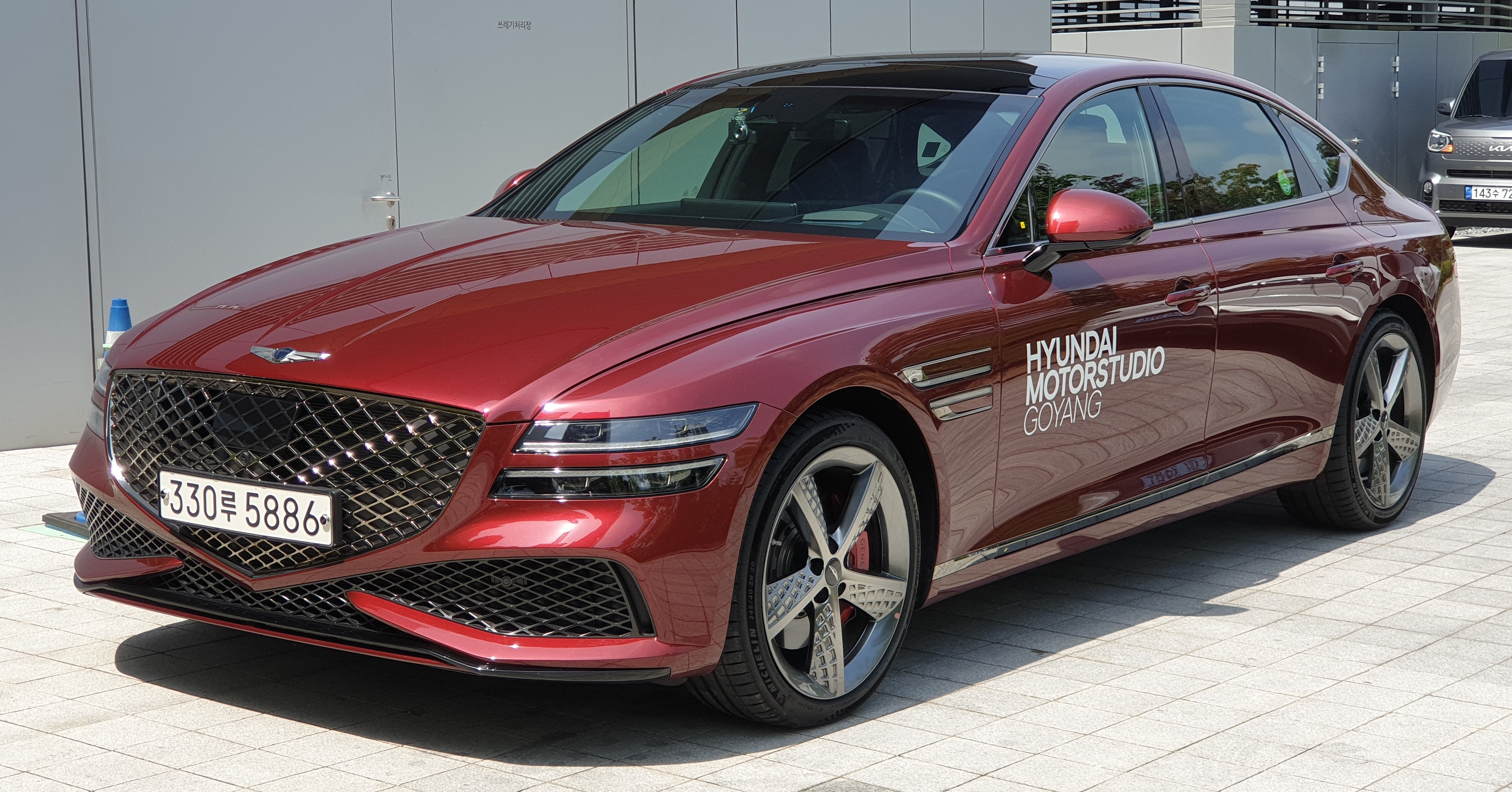
G80 Sport (pre-facelift)

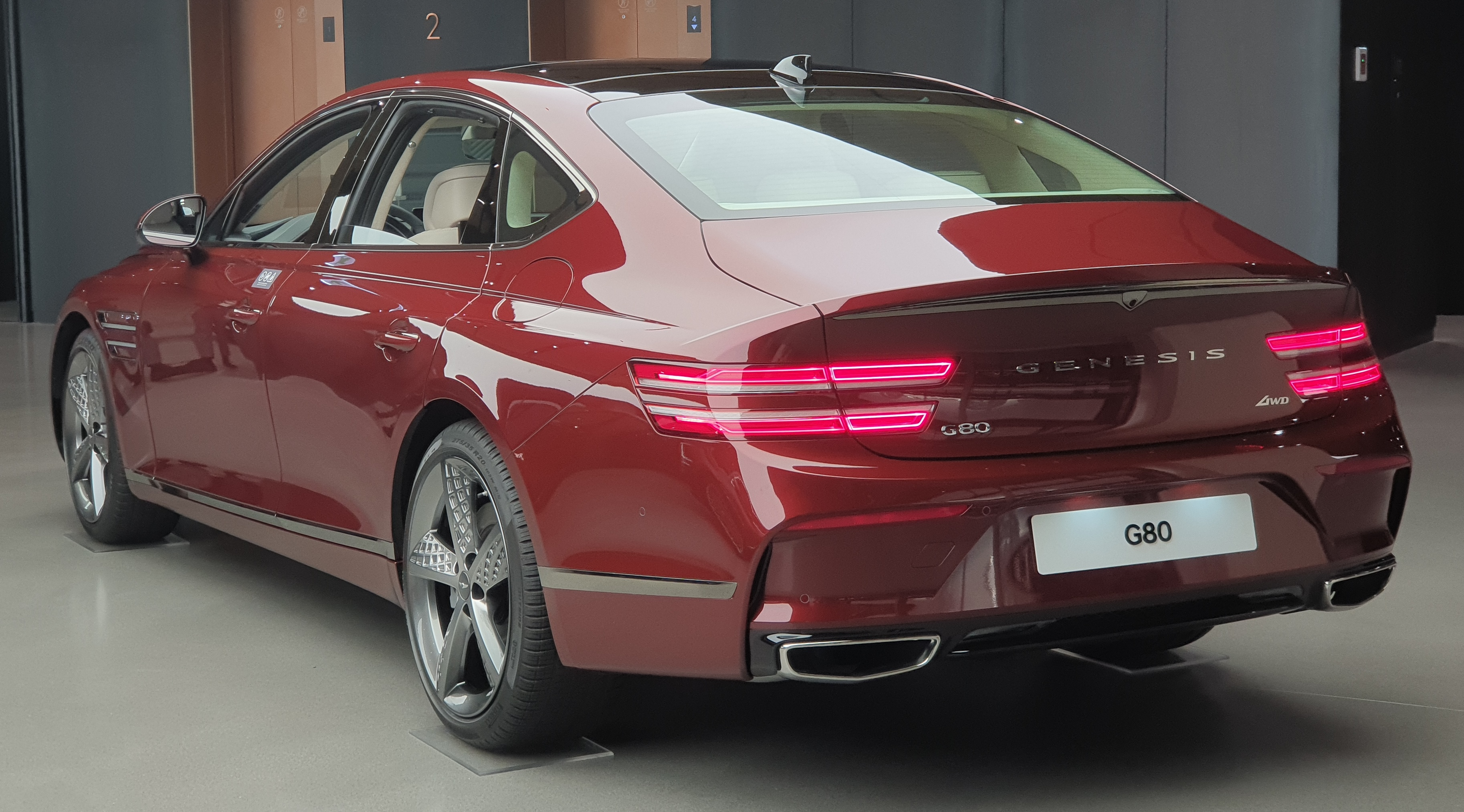
Rear view (pre-facelift)

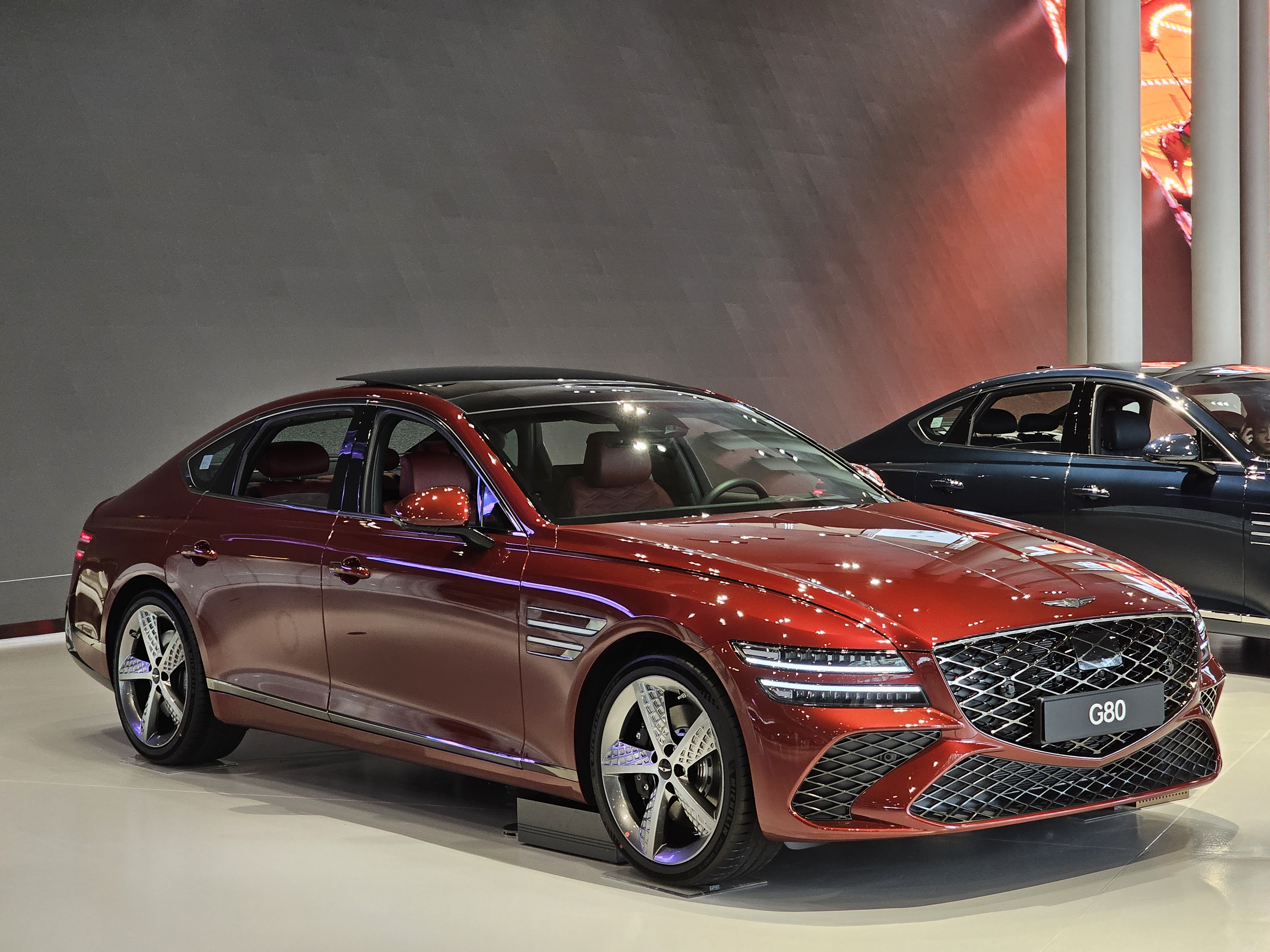
G80 Sport (facelift)

=== Powertrain ===
G80
Model	Years	Transmission	Power@rpm	Torque@rpm	Acceleration 0–100 km/h (0–62 mph) (official)	Top speed
Gasoline
Smartstream G2.5 T-GDi	2020–present	8-speed automatic	304 PS (224 kW; 300 hp) @ 5,800 rpm	43 kg⋅m (422 N⋅m; 311 lbf⋅ft) @ 1,650–4,000 rpm	6.0s (RWD); 6.3s (AWD)	240 km/h (149 mph); 250 km/h (155 mph)
Smartstream G3.5 T-GDi	2020–present	8-speed automatic	380 PS (279 kW; 375 hp) @ 5,800 rpm	54 kg⋅m (530 N⋅m; 391 lbf⋅ft) @ 1,300–4,500 rpm	4.9s 5.1s	250 km/h (155 mph)
Diesel
Smartstream D2.2 CRDi	2020–2021	8-speed automatic	210 PS (154 kW; 207 hp) @ 3,800 rpm	45 kg⋅m (441 N⋅m; 325 lbf⋅ft) @ 1,750–2,750 rpm	7.9s–8.0s	236 km/h (147 mph)

Electrified G80
Battery	Years	Layout	Output	Torque	0–100 km/h (0–62 mph) (official)	Top speed	Range
87.2 kWh	2021–2024	AWD	272 kW (370 PS; 365 hp)	700 N⋅m (71.4 kg⋅m; 516 lb⋅ft)	4.9 s	225 km/h (140 mph)	520 km (323 mi) (WLTP); 427 km (265 mi) (South Korea); 454 km (282 mi) (US EPA)
94.5 kWh	2024–present	AWD	272 kW (370 PS; 365 hp)	700 N⋅m (71.4 kg⋅m; 516 lb⋅ft)	4.9 s	225 km/h (140 mph)	475 km (295 mi) (South Korea)

=== Safety ===
Euro NCAP test results Genesis G80 2.2 CRDi GLS (LHD) (2021)
Test	Points	%
Overall:	5 /5 stars	
Adult occupant:	34.9	91%
Child occupant:	43	87%
Pedestrian:	41.9	77%
Safety assist:	14.7	91%

2021 Genesis G80 NHTSA
Overall:	5/5 stars
Frontal driver:	4/5 stars
Frontal passenger:	5/5 stars
Side driver:	5/5 stars
Side passenger:	5/5 stars
Side pole driver:	5/5 stars
Side pole passenger:	5/5 stars
Rollover AWD:	10.10%

IIHS:
Category	Rating
Moderate overlap frontal offset	Good
Side impact	Good
Roof strength	Good (Note: Strength-to-weight ratio: 5.26)

ANCAP test results Genesis G80 (2021, aligned with Euro NCAP)
Test	Points	%
Overall:	5 /5 stars	
Adult occupant:	34.98	91%
Child occupant:	42.43	86%
Pedestrian:	41.87	77%
Safety assist:	12.92	80%

== Production ==
The Genesis G80 is manufactured in Ulsan, Korea. Between 2015 and 2018 worldwide sales of the G80 were 127,283. Hyundai Motor America sold 6,166 units in 2016, 16,214 units in 2017, and 7,663 units in 2018 in the United States. Hyundai attributes flagging US sales in 2018 to disagreements among its dealership networks that caused deliberate dwindling supplies, not on reduced consumer demand.

== Marketing ==
During the 2017 NFL Pro Bowl, Genesis G80 sedans were awarded to offensive and defensive "most valuable players."

== Awards ==
- 2017 International Design Excellence Award (IDEA), finalist
- 2017–2021 Insurance Institute for Highway Safety (IIHS), Top Safety Pick Plus
- 2019 Women's Choice Award, Best Luxury Sedan Under $50,000 for Reliability and Overall
- 2020 J.D. Power U.S. Vehicle Dependability Study, Most Dependable Midsize Premium Car

== Sales ==
G80
Year	South Korea	United States	Canada	Germany	China	Global
2016	42,754	6,166	55			61,021
2017	39,700	16,214	433			56,914
2018	37,219	7,446	393			44,937
2019	22,284	7,095	324			29,188
2020	56,150	3,359	189			60,643
2021	58,111	6,031	277	50		64,182
2022	44,479	4,125		76		51,652
2023	43,236	4,170	330		822	52,838
2024	45,373	3,758	186		897	52,277
2025					763	

G80 EV
Year	South Korea	United States	Canada	Germany	China	Global
2021	1,353	—N/a	—N/a	—N/a		1,384
2022	2,675	—N/a	—N/a	61		4,026
2023	1,037	1,329	53	—N/a	108	2,294
2024	481	397	7	—N/a	47	767
2025					4	
