= PI =

PI may refer to:

== Arts and media ==
- Politically Incorrect (blog), a German political blog
- Seattle Post-Intelligencer or P-I, a newspaper in the United States
- Primitive Instinct, an English rock band formed in 1987
- P.I. (TV series), 2017 Singaporean TV series

== Businesses and organizations ==
=== Political parties ===
- Partido Independiente or Independent Party, a political party in Uruguay
- Partido Intransigente or Intransigent Party, an Argentine political party
- Partit per la Independència, a political party in Catalonia (Spain) of the 1990s

=== Other businesses and organizations ===
- Perimeter Institute for Theoretical Physics, a research centre in Ontario, Canada
- Privacy International, a UK-based charity that supports the right to privacy across the world
- Defunct Piedmont Airlines (1948–89) (IATA airline code PI)
- Philadelphia International, record label founded in 1971

== Science and technology ==
=== Biology and medicine ===
- Parental investment, in evolutionary biology
- Paternity Index, a value used to calculate probability of paternity
- Perfusion index, a parameter in pulse oxymetry
- Pistillata, a gene that influences the development of flowers in the ABC model of flower development
- Phosphatidylinositol, a class of lipids
- Ponderal index, a measure of leanness of a person (similar to body mass index)
- Propidium iodide, a chemical used as a DNA stain
- Primary immunodeficiency
- Protease inhibitor (pharmacology), class of drugs used to treat or prevent infection by viruses, including HIV and Hepatitis C
- Protease inhibitor (biology), molecules that inhibit the function of proteases
- Pulsatility index, a ratio of blood flow rates

=== Computing ===
- Persistent identifier, a long-lasting reference to a digital object
- Processing instruction, an SGML and XML node type
- Programmed instruction, a technology invented to improve teaching
- Provider-independent address space, a type of internet (IP) address

=== Other uses in science and technology ===
- Isoelectric point (pI), the pH at which a particular molecule or surface carries no net electrical charge.
- Power integrity, in digital electronics
- PI controller, proportional-integral controller, a concept in automation and control engineering
- Plasticity index, a measure of the plasticity of a soil
- Polyimide, a polymer of imide monomers
- Positive Ignition Engine, different name for spark-ignition engine
- Preußische Instruktionen, a cataloging system for libraries
- Principal investigator, the lead scientist or engineer for a particular project

== Other uses ==
- Pi, an irrational number represented with the symbol π
- Pass interference, a foul in American and Canadian gridiron football
- People's Initiative, one of the modes in which the constitution of the Philippines could be amended
- Personal injury
- Philippine Islands (P.I.), the commonly used name of the Philippines during the US colonial period
- Pirot, a city located in south-eastern Serbia (license plate code PI)
- Political incorrectness or politically incorrect, commonly abbreviated to PI or PIC
- Poris railway station, a railway station in Tangerang, Indonesia (station code PI)
- Preliminary injunction, an injunction issued by a court prior to a final determination of the merits of a legal case
- Private investigator, a person who can be hired to undertake investigations
- Pro forma invoice, in business
- Profitability index, the ratio of payoff to investment of a proposed project

== See also ==
- Pi (disambiguation)
- P1 (disambiguation)
- PL (disambiguation)
