= Π1 =

π1 or Π1 or Pi1 may refer to:

== Mathematics ==
- π_{1}, a notation for the scalar projection onto the first component
- π_{1}, the fundamental group of a topological space
- Π_{1}, the fundamental groupoid of a topological space
- Π^{0}_{1}, or Π_{1}, a classification in the arithmetical hierarchy

== Other uses ==
- Yudo π1 (Pi1), a car model
- Pi1 (gene), a gene found in Oryza sativa for fungus resistance
- Pi1, a type of torpedo warhead used by Germany in World War II; see List of World War II torpedoes of Germany
- Pi1 (neurotoxin) a scorpion toxin

== See also ==
- Pil (disambiguation)
- PII (disambiguation)
- P1 (disambiguation) (Greek: π1; romanized "p1"; pronounced "pi1")
- Pi (disambiguation)
- π (disambiguation)
