= Pone =

Pone may refer to:

== Food ==
- Pone (food), a type of baked or fried bread in American cuisine
- Corn pone, a type of cornbread

== Other uses ==
- Pone (honorific), a Lithuanian honorific for men
- Pone (surname), a surname
- Pone Kingpetch (1935-1982), Thai boxer
- Musical alias of Guilhem Gallart, French record producer
- Pone (card player), term for non-dealer in certain card games

== See also ==
- Pwn
- P1 (disambiguation), P-one
- Pony (disambiguation)
