= Hyundai N Vision 74 =

Upcoming electric sports car by Hyundai

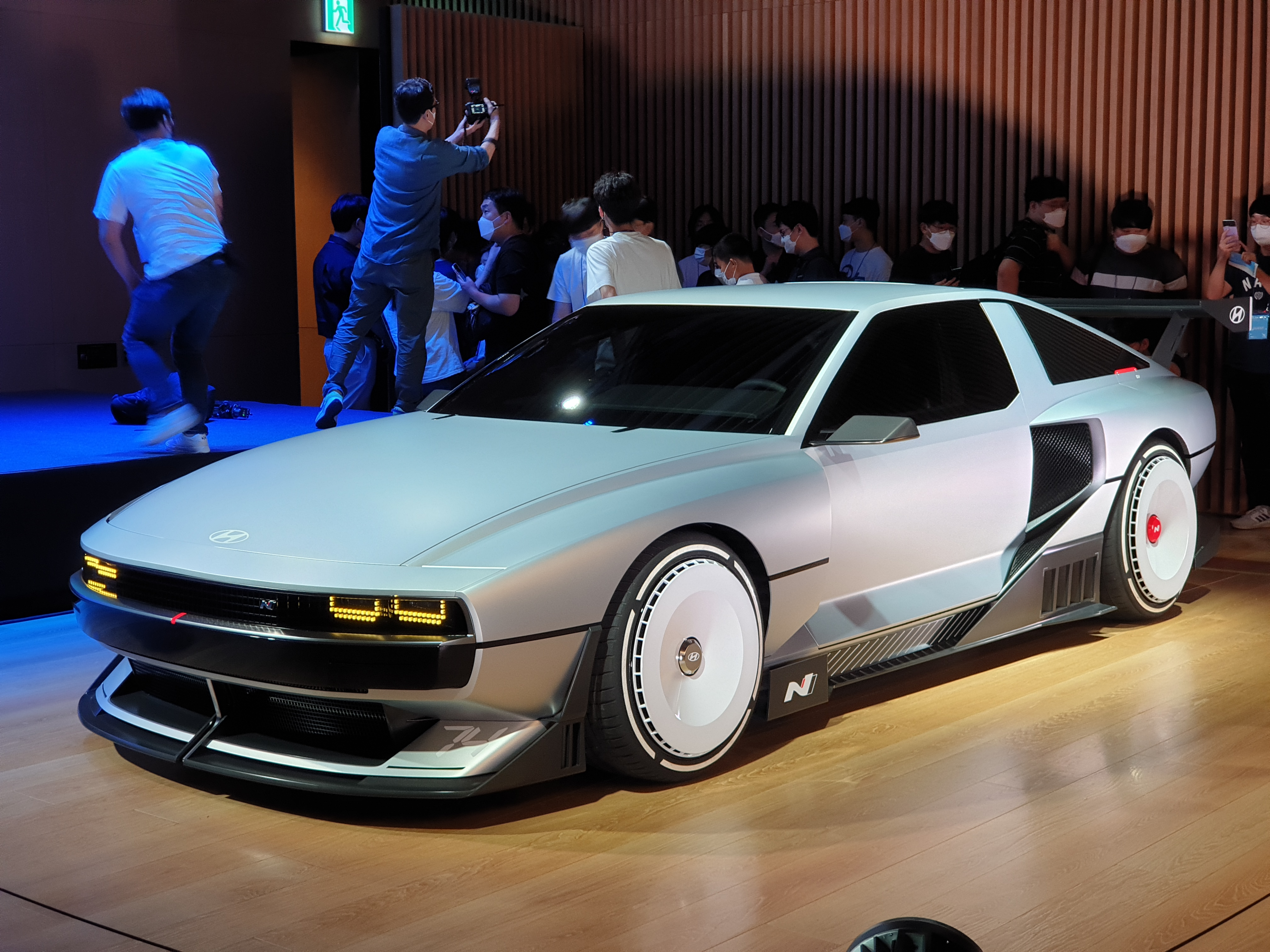

Overview
- Manufacturer: Hyundai
- Production: 2022 (concept); 2026 (production)
- Model years: 2026 - to commence
- Designer: SangYup Lee

Body and chassis
- Layout: Rear-motor, rear-wheel-drive
- Related: Genesis X

Powertrain
- Engine: 85 kW (114 hp) net H_{2} fuel cell, 4.2 kg (9.3 lb) storage
- Electric motor: 2 electric motors
- Power output: 500 kW (671 hp)
- Transmission: 1-speed
- Hybrid drivetrain: Hydrogen-Electric hybrid
- Battery: 62.4 kWh
- Range: up to 372 mi

Dimensions
- Wheelbase: 2,905 mm (114.4 in)
- Length: 4,952 mm (195.0 in)
- Width: 1,995 mm (78.5 in)
- Height: 1,331 mm (52.4 in)
- Curb weight: 2,472 kg (5,450 lb)

Chronology
- Predecessor: Hyundai Pony Coupe (concept)

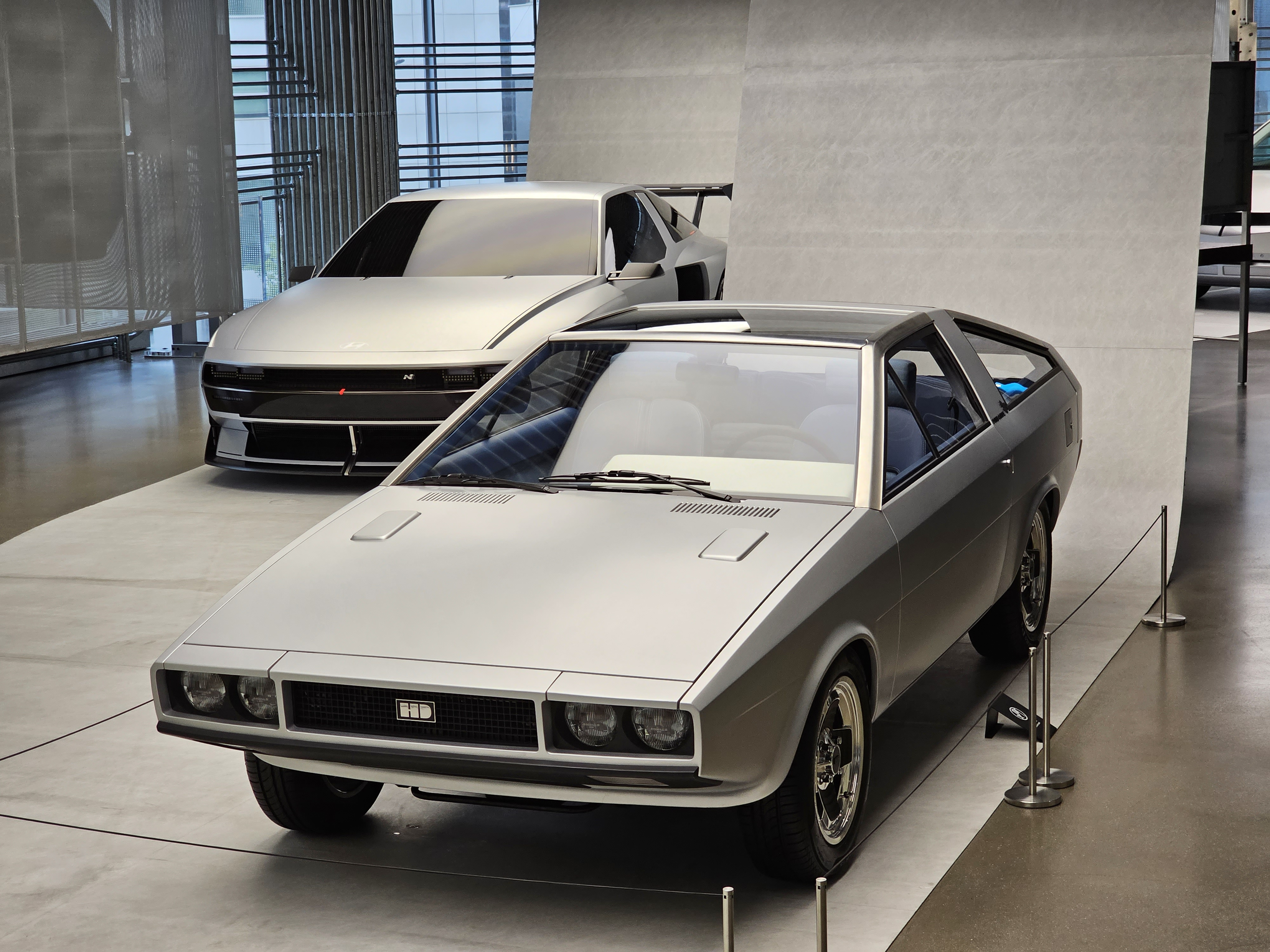
The N Vision 74 with the Pony-concept of 1974 in front

The Hyundai N Vision 74 is an upcoming battery electric concept sports car developed by Hyundai, based on the 1974 Pony coupe unveiled at the Turin Auto Show in 1974.

The vehicle was unveiled as a concept car at N Day 2022, an event organized by the Hyundai N performance division in 15 July 2022 at Busan, South Korea, alongside the Hyundai RN22e concept based on the Hyundai Ioniq 6 N electric vehicle. The N Vision 74 is a rear-wheel-drive coupe driven by two electric traction motors, both on the rear axle; power is provided by both a storage battery and a hydrogen fuel cell.

In December 2023, Hyundai confirmed that the N Vision 74 would be in production with 200 units starting in 2026.

== History ==
Hyundai teased the N Vision 74 alongside the RN22e on July 6, 2022 before unveiling them on July 15, 2022.

The styling for the N Vision 74 is inspired by the Hyundai Pony Coupe Concept (1974), while the underlying technologies were inspired by the N 2025 Vision Gran Turismo (2015). The drivetrain was co-developed with Rimac Automobili and first shown in 2021 fitted to the Kia Stinger-derived Vision FK concept. Albert Biermann confirmed the roadgoing N Vision 74 prototype was derived from "a [Kia] Stinger [...] The whole idea started with a different brand. It wasn't a [Hyundai] N thing at all, it was for the [Genesis] luxury brand. But then we said this is a lot of complicated stuff so we have to build a mecha-proto – that's what we call a prototype built on an existing car – and then apply the new systems. We realised the Stinger was the closest in terms of size."

Although the 1974 Pony Coupe Concept designed by Giorgetto Giugiaro was a static model when exhibited at the Turin Motor Show, sketches and blueprints were prepared for a production version that never came to fruition, as there was no suitable engine nor was there a business case to bring it to market. In addition to the production Hyundai Pony, Italdesign and Giugiaro were responsible for designing similar wedge-shaped sports cars at around the same time, including the BMW M1 and Lotus Esprit. Some of the initial sketches of the N Vision 74 by Hyundai chief of design SangYup Lee were dated to 2016.

N Day 2022 was intended to demonstrate Hyundai N's focus on performance, even as Hyundai incorporates more electric vehicles into its lineup. Unlike the typical concept car, which are static styling exercises, the N Vision 74 is what Hyundai call a road-capable "Rolling Lab". A follow-up N Day event was held in September 2022 for the automotive press, which had the opportunity to drive the prototype on the Bilster Berg track in Germany.

In December 2023, it was reported that Hyundai had confirmed plans to produce 100 units of the N Vision 74, with 70 cars sold to public customers and the other 30 reserved for racing. The car will reportedly have around 800 horsepower, and a top speed of 155 mph from the concept model, with production beginning in 2026. In August 2024, Hyundai confirmed that production would be underway as part of plans to introduce 21 new models by 2030.

There was some uncertainty reports about if the N Vision 74 would actually go into production, starting in September 2024, when there were insider news reported that Hyundai reportedly cancelled plans to build the N Vision 74 due to unknown reasons or circumstances. In February 2025, Hyundai teased the production spec of the N Vision 74 next to the concept model and other EV's, confirming that the car is scheduled to go into production. In August 2026, Hyundai filed 2 trademarks for the N Vision 74.

== Design and specifications ==
Exterior design is credited to SangYup Lee, who said "I was even sketching [N Vision 74 ideas] on the plane to Korea, on my way to start at Hyundai. I wanted to create a car that celebrated Hyundai's roots."

The N Vision 74 is equipped with dual electric traction motors (both fitted to the rear axle) with a combined output of 670 hp (500 kW) and 664 lb⋅ft (900 N⋅m) of torque, drawing from a 62.4 kW-hr battery pack and hydrogen tanks storing 4.2 kg (9.3 lb) for an on-board fuel cell. Peak fuel cell output is 85 kW (114 hp). Driving each rear wheel with its own traction motor allows torque vectoring. Hyundai engineers are considering adding a third electric traction motor to the front axle.

To turn Lee's designs into a roadgoing prototype, Hyundai used components from existing vehicles; for example, the fuel cell and hydrogen storage system were taken from the Hyundai Nexo, the electrical system and traction motors are similar to E-GMP vehicles such as the Ioniq 5 and 6, and portions of the body structure were derived from the Genesis G70. As driven by Motor Trend at a press event in September 2022, the car was fitted with Pirelli P Zero tires, 270/35R20 front and 315/30R21 rear.

Hyundai claims the car can accelerate to 60 mph (97 km/h) in four seconds and has a range (including use of the fuel cell as a range-extending auxiliary power unit) of more than 372 mi (599 km) under the WLTP cycle. Top speed is more than 250 km/h (160 mph).

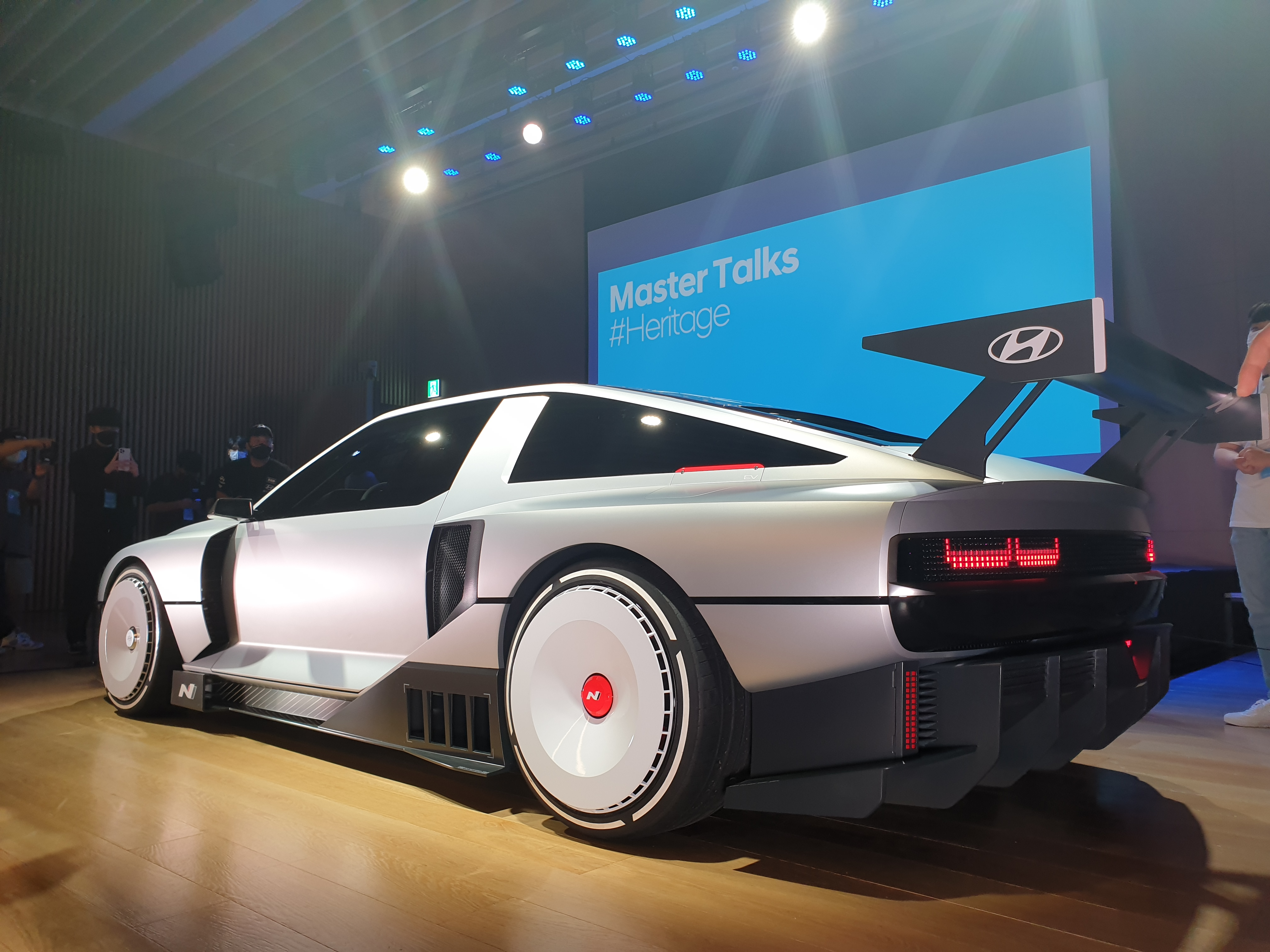
Rear view

=== Reception ===
The styling of the N Vision 74 has been praised as blending inspiration from the Lancia 037 and DMC DeLorean with the "Parametric Pixel" design language from the Ioniq family. Additional commentators have likened the concept vehicle to sports coupes from the 1970s and 1980s, including the Audi Quattro, BMW M1, Mitsubishi Starion, Nissan Silvia, Toyota AE86, Toyota Supra, and Volkswagen Scirocco, all members of what Jonny Lieberman said was "the zeitgeist of today's car enthusiast".

Because the car's components are largely derived from production vehicles, the cost of developing a production N Vision 74 could be lowered; Hyundai sources note the N Vision 74 shares the same wheelbase as the Genesis X Speedium Coupe concept and stated they are developing a third concept coupe.
