= Pony (disambiguation) =

A pony is a small horse.

Pony, PONY or ponies may also refer to:

== Businesses and brands ==
- Pony (brand), a footwear and apparel brand
- Hyundai Pony, a model of car
- Kodak Pony, a camera
- Pony (Seattle), a gay bar in Seattle, Washington, US
- Pony Malta, a Colombian soft drink brand of Malta
- Pony.ai, a Chinese autonomous vehicle technology company

== Film and television ==
- Pony (film), a 2002 Canadian short film by Ed Gass-Donnelly
- Ponies (TV series), a 2026 television series
- "The Pony" (The Amazing World of Gumball), a 2013 television episode
- "The Pony" (Boardwalk Empire), a 2012 television episode

== Music ==
- The Ponys (band), an American rock band
- Pony (Orville Peck album) (2019)
- Pony (Rex Orange County album) (2019)
- Pony (Spratleys Japs album) (1998)
- "Pony" (Kasey Chambers song) (2004)
- "Pony" (Ginuwine song) (1996)
- "Pony", a 2019 song by DaBaby from Baby on Baby
- "Pony", a 1972 song by Annette Peacock from I’m the One
- "Pony", a 1996 song by Swirlies from They Spent Their Wild Youthful Days in the Glittering World of the Salons
- "Pony", a 2007 song by Wildbirds & Peacedrums from Heartcore
- "Ponies" (song), a 1987 single by Michael Johnson
- Pony (band), a Canadian indie power pop band

== Measure of volume ==
- Pony bottle, a small cylinder of breathing gas strapped to a diver's main tank for emergency use
- Pony bottle (beer), a bottle size popular in the United States
- Pony glass, a glassware size
- Pony keg, a beer keg size
- Pony, one U.S. fluid ounce in bartending terminology

== People ==
- Pony Diehl (c. 1848–c. 1888), American Old West outlaw
- Arthur Halloway (1885–1961), pioneering Australian rugby league football player and coach
- Pony Poindexter (1926–1988), American jazz saxophonist
- Rodrigo Ruiz (born 1972), Chilean football manager and former player
- Jimmy Ryan (baseball) (1863–1923), American Major League Baseball player
- Pony (make-up artist) (born 1990), Korean make-up artist and Internet personality
- Pony Ma (born 1971), Chinese businessman, investor, and philanthropist

== Places ==
- Pony, Montana, United States, an unincorporated community and census-designated place
- Pony Mountain, Massachusetts, United States - see Chapel Brook
- Pony Lake, Ross Island, Antarctica

== Sports ==
- Ponsonby Ponies, a rugby league club based in Ponsonby, New Zealand
- St. Joseph Ponies, the 1941 name of the St. Joseph Saints, a minor league baseball team that was based in St. Joseph, Missouri
- PONY Baseball and Softball (Protect Our Nation's Youth), a youth baseball and softball organization
- Pennsylvania–Ontario–New York League, commonly known as PONY League, an early name of the New York–Penn League in Minor League Baseball

== Other uses ==
- To pony or ponying, to lead (a horse) from another horse
- Pony (dance), a dance popular in the 1960s
- Pony, a London slang term for £25
- Pony (My Little Pony), a fictional species in My Little Pony
- "Ponies" (short story), a short story by Kij Johnson
- Ponytail or pony, a hair style
- Pony (programming language), open-source actor-model based programming language

== See also ==
- Pony car, a class of car similar to the Ford Mustang
- Pony Club, an equestrian club for young people
- Pony Express, a U.S. rapid-mail service before the advent of railroads
- PONIE, a project of Perl
- Pomy (disambiguation)
