= Hyundai Vision FK =

- Photo from Hyundai press release

Overview
- Manufacturer: Hyundai

Body and chassis
- Class: sports coupe
- Layout: Mid-motor, rear-wheel-drive
- Related: Kia Stinger; Hyundai Nexo

Powertrain
- Engine: 85 kW (114 hp) net H_{2} fuel cell, 4 kg (8.8 lb) storage
- Electric motor: 2 electric motors
- Power output: >500 kW (671 hp)
- Transmission: 1-speed
- Battery: >60 kW-hr

Chronology
- Successor: Hyundai N Vision 74

The Hyundai Vision FK is a concept car that uses a plug-in hybrid drivetrain with both a large traction battery and a hydrogen fuel cell; the concept vehicle was developed by Hyundai and Rimac Automobili. The mid-motor, rear-wheel-drive sports coupe was unveiled at the Hydrogen Wave Forum in September 2021, an event organized by Hyundai to outline its plans to popularize hydrogen vehicles by 2040 for "Everyone, Everything and Everywhere". Power is delivered through two electric traction motors, both on the rear axle. The Vision FK can be plugged in to recharge its traction battery, which has more than 60 kW-hr of energy storage capacity, and the onboard fuel cell affords it a range greater than 600 km (370 mi).

== History ==
Albert Biermann, who heads Hyundai's research & development division, presented the Vision FK in a video on September 6, 2021. It is unclear if a prototype Vision FK was constructed or not. A development mule based on the Kia Stinger with visible exterior modifications matching the general configuration of the Vision FK was photographed undergoing testing in South Korea earlier in 2021, and Hyundai's N performance arm has been developing mid-engine, rear-wheel drive concepts based on the Veloster since 2014.

After rumors began in May 2022 that Porsche AG would take a larger investment in Rimac, Hyundai reportedly discontinued joint development of the Vision FK and vowed to finish the hydrogen hybrid sports car internally. However, both Rimac founder Mate Rimac and Hyundai denied that joint development had stopped.

== Design and specifications ==
As shown, the Vision FK is similar externally to the Kia Stinger, albeit with significant interior changes to accommodate the hybrid drivetrain and electric traction motors. The Vision FK is a two-door coupe, unlike the Stinger, which is sold as a five-door liftback. In the video, the Vision FK was finished in a primarily black-and-white pixelated vinyl wrap with diagonal blue pixel accents on each side.

The electric plug-in hybrid powertrain was designed and built by Rimac Automobili; Hyundai contributed the vehicle's hydrogen fuel cell stack, which was borrowed from the NEXO. Hydrogen fuel is stored in two tanks over the rear axle, each holding 2 kg (4.4 lb), and the fuel cell stack is mounted over the front axle, with an average and peak output of 85 and 95 kW (114 and 127 hp), respectively.

The drivetrain uses two electric traction motors driving the rear axle, with one motor for each side, allowing the car to perform torque vectoring. Combined output is greater than 500 kW (670 hp). Hyundai state the car can accelerate from 0 to 100 km/h (62 mph) in 3.9 seconds and achieves a top speed of 260 km/h (160 mph). Claimed range is more than 600 km (370 mi) thanks to the use of the hydrogen fuel cell.

A T-shaped storage battery is carried between the axles where the rear seat and central tunnel would be on a conventional rear-wheel drive automobile. It bears a visual resemblance to the battery fitted to the Rimac Nevera supercar. The battery has a capacity of more than 60 kW-hr using cylindrical cells, allowing it to deliver a high output power (580 kW (780 hp) peak), albeit with a lower storage density than the batteries used in the all-electric E-GMP platform.

=== N Vision 74 ===
Approximately ten months later at the N Day event in July 2022, the Hyundai N Vision 74 was unveiled, a sports coupe with styling inspired by the 1974 Hyundai Pony Coupe concept. The 1974 concept was designed by Giorgetto Giugiaro at Italdesign. The drivetrain of the N Vision 74 is derived from the Vision FK, and the specifications and claimed performance of the two concepts are nearly identical.
