= Radio P1 =

Radio P1 may refer to:

- DR P1, Danish radio station
- NRK P1, Norwegian radio station
- NRK P1+, Norwegian radio station, via DABradio and online
- Sveriges Radio P1, Swedish radio station

== See also ==
- P1 (disambiguation)
