= PL2 (disambiguation) =

PL2 may refer to:

- China Railways PL2, one of the industrial locomotives used by China Railway
- Pazmany PL-1 (and PL-2), American two-seat trainer and personal light aircraft
- PL-2, a series of Chinese air-to-air missiles
- Premier League 2, the under-21 youth development league for association football in England
- Harter's 2-Poisson indexing-model, a divergence-from-randomness model used in information retrieval

== See also ==
- PLL (disambiguation)
- PL (disambiguation)
