= PLL (disambiguation) =

PLL usually refers to phase-locked loops, a type of electronic circuit and control system. It may also refer to:

- Independent Political Labour League, a New Zealand labour party that originated as the Political Labour League
- Partido Liberal Libertario, an Argentine political party
- Permutation of Last Layer, a step in solving a Rubik's Cube in the CFOP method
- Polylysine, a chemical substance
- Ponta Pelada Airport, a military airbase in Manaus, Brazil
- Posterior longitudinal ligament, a spinal ligament
- Premier Lacrosse League, a lacrosse league in the United States started in 2019
- Pretty Little Liars (book series), a series of young adult novels by Sara Shepard
- Pretty Little Liars, a 2010 TV series based on the novels by Sara Shepard
- Professional Lacrosse League, a former lacrosse developmental league in the United States
- The PLLs, an Italian Eurodance duo based in Munich
- Polskie Linie Lotnicze LOT

== See also ==
- PL (disambiguation)
- PL2 (disambiguation)
