= 1P =

1P may refer to:

- 1 naya paisa (Indian coin)
- 1 paisa (Indian coin)
- 1p, an arm of Chromosome 1 (human)
- 1P, proved Oil reserves
- British Pound Sterling 1p coin, see Penny (British decimal coin)
- Halley's Comet official name of 1P/Halley
- One Piece a 1997 Japanese manga and anime
- Polonia 1, 1P, Polish TV channel of the Polcast Television
- Single-player video game

== See also ==
- P1 (disambiguation)
