= P1 =

P1, P01, P-1 or P.1 may refer to:

== Computing, robotics, and, telecommunications ==
- DSC-P1, a 2000 Sony Cyber-shot P series camera model
- Sony Ericsson P1, a UIQ 3 smartphone
- Packet One, the first company to launch WiMAX service in Southeast Asia
- Peer 1, an Internet hosting provider
- Honda P1, a 1993 Honda P series of robots, an ASIMO predecessor

== Media ==
- DR P1, a Danish radio network operated by Danmarks Radio
- NRK P1, a Norwegian radio network operated by the Norwegian Broadcasting Corporation
- SR P1, a Swedish radio network operated by Sveriges Radio
- Polonia 1, a Polish TV channel of the Polcast Television

== Military ==
- P-1 Hawk, a 1923 biplane fighter of the U.S. Army Air Corps
- Kawasaki P-1, a Japanese maritime patrol aircraft (previously P-X)
- P-1 (missile), a Soviet anti-ship cruise missile

== Science ==
=== Biology ===
- P1 antigen, identifies P antigen system
- P1 laboratory, biosafety -level-1 laboratory
- P1 phage, a bacterial virus
- SARS-CoV-2 Gamma variant, a strain of COVID-19 virus SARS-CoV-2 first detected in Manaus, Brazil in 2020
- ATC code P01 Antiprotozoals, a subgroup of the Anatomical Therapeutic Chemical Classification System
- Pericarp color1 (p1), a gene in the phlobaphene biosynthesis pathway in maize
- C1 and P1 (neuroscience), a component of the visual evoked potential
- P1 nuclease, a nuclease that works on single-stranded DNA as well as RNA

=== Other sciences ===
- Period 1 of the periodic table
- Pollard's p − 1 algorithm for integer factorization
- P-ONE - a proposed neutrino detector
- P1 and P1̅, three-dimensional space group numbers 1 and 2 (respectively)

== Transportation ==
=== Automobiles ===
- P1 International, a car club founded in Leatherhead, Surrey, England
- Alfa Romeo P1, a 1932 Grand Prix car
- Allard P1, a 1949 British five seater two door sports saloon
- McLaren P1, a sports car succeeding the McLaren F1.
- Porsche P1, first electric car produced by Ferdinand Porsche in 1898
- P-1, development code name of the Subaru 1500 automobile
- P1 race class in the Le Mans racing series

=== Aircraft ===
- Abrams P-1 Explorer, an American aerial survey aircraft
- Dewoitine P-1, a Dewoitine aircraft
- DFW P.1, a passenger aircraft development of the 1916 DFW C.V
- Paradise P-1 LSA, a Brazilian light-sport aircraft

=== Rail ===
- P1 (AirTrain Newark station), a station on AirTrain Newark, New Jersey, United States
- Alsace-Lorraine P 1, a German steam locomotives class
- LNER Class P1, a class of locomotive designed by Nigel Gresley

== Other uses ==
- Front-runner, or position 1 (P.1)
- Papyrus 1, also known as P1, P^{1}, or 𝔓^{1}, an early papyrus copy of part of the New Testament
- Walther P1, an aluminum-framed variant of the Walther P38 pistol
- Pioneer One, an open source web series
- P-1 (submarine), a fictional patrol craft in the animated TV series Marine Boy
- P-1 (mountain lion), a mountain lion that lived in the Santa Monica Mountain National Recreation Area
- The first year of school, Primary 1 or P1, in Scottish schools

== See also ==
- Pone (disambiguation)
- PL (disambiguation)
- PI (disambiguation)
- 1P (disambiguation)
- Π1 (disambiguation) (Greek: π1; romanized "p1"; pronounced "pi1")
