= Primitive Instinct =

English rock band

Primitive Instinct ("PI") are an English progressive and classic rock band, formed in 1987 in Maidstone, Kent, England, by guitarist, vocalist, and songwriter Nick Sheridan, who still fronts the band today. To the uninitiated, a ballpark description of PI would be modern-day Marillion meets Pink Floyd. Importantly though, PI have developed their own distinctive and individual approach, thus ensuring their own sound.

== History ==
Formed in 1987, the original line-up consisted of Nick Sheridan (guitar and vocals), Andy Quinnell (keyboards), Billy Geddes (bass), Nick Brown (guitar) and Richard Culham (drums). In the late 1980s and early 1990s, they played constantly, building up an ever-increasing fan base in the south-east of England, later to spread around Great Britain and abroad. During this period they released four cassette-only fan albums (A Primitive Instinct, Once Round Your Ear, On A Rainy Night and Into The Ocean). The early 1990s heralded the arrival of bassist "Pic" Hayes, who remains today, as the nucleus of the band with Sheridan. Nick Brown also left the band around the same time.

In 1994, PI secured a deal with Cyclops Records, releasing their first CD album, Floating Tangibility. Meeting with widespread critical acclaim from all quarters it sold several thousand copies with very little promotion. The 1990s saw them securing support slots with the likes of IQ, Pendragon, and John Wetton, with the latter musician being particularly impressed by their live show. Drummer Richard Culham was replaced by Chris Brown in 1995. Principal songwriter Sheridan did not rush to follow-up albums, and to stem the demand from fans waiting for a follow-up to Floating Tangibility, PI released a cherry-picked selection of early demos as "Ice For Eskimos" in 1998. Keyboardist Andy Quinnell left to pursue a career in banking, leaving PI to continue as a three-piece band.

=== Belief ===
A new album proved to be worth the long wait for it, when in 2000 PI released Belief. Setting the benchmark for future releases by the band, it combines great songwriting, memorable choruses and a sense of the epic. The early 2000s saw PI promoting Belief extensively with gigs across the UK and Europe, and the Belief album received many excellent reviews and much critical acclaim from across the world.

In 2005, Chris Brown left to run a diving centre in Florida and was replaced on drums by long-term fan Stuart Bailey.

=== 25th anniversary ===
On 3 November 2012, Primitive Instinct performed a special show in their home town to coincide with their 25th anniversary. The gig was a big success, with many past members of PI joining the current line-up on stage. The show was also filmed for possible future release.

=== One Man's Refuge ===
The 25th-anniversary gig also marked the release of their long-awaited new album One Man's Refuge. After just one review, orders for the new album came in from across the world, including Japan, Russia, Israel, the United States and across Europe.

== Current status ==
Along with Nick, bassist Pic has been with the band some 25 years now and, with the Jonathan Vincent on keyboards and newest member Simon Harrisson on drums, they truly are an awesome foursome. The last few years has seen the boys play shows with Wishbone Ash, Stray, the Yardbirds and Karnataka. A few years back John Wetton was highly impressed with the live act.

=== Current members ===
- Nick Sheridan, guitar, keyboards and vocals
- Pic Hayes, bass and vocals
- Simon Harrison, drums
- Jonathan Vincent, keyboards and vocals

=== Previous members ===
- Andy Quinnell, keyboards
- Richard Culham, drums
- Nick Brown, lead guitar
- Graham McGarrick, drums
- Billy Geddes, bass
- Richard Chater, bass
- Stuart Bailey, drums
- Chris Brown, drums
