= Pomy =

Pomy may refer to several places:

- Pomy VD, in Switzerland
- Pomy, Aude, a commune of the Aude département, in France
