= PII =

PII may refer to:

- Peace Islands Institute, a non-profit of Turkish-Americans in New Jersey
- Personal data, also known as personally identifiable information (PII)
- Pentium II, a computer processor
- Polaris Inc., New York Stock Exchange stock symbol PII
- Public-interest immunity, previously known as Crown privilege, in English common law
- Publisher Item Identifier, in scientific journals
- Professional indemnity insurance
- Proto-Indo-Iranian language
- Indonesian Islamic Party
