= PIL =

Pil or PIL may refer to:

== Legal terms ==
- Public international law
- Private international law
- Public interest law
- Public interest litigation in India

== Music ==
- Pil (singer) (born 1990), Danish singer and songwriter
- Poslednja Igra Leptira, a former Yugoslavian pop rock band
- Public Image Ltd, an English post-punk band

== Places ==
- Pil, Iran, a village in Mazandaran Province, Iran
- Pil (placename) a Welsh placename element
- Pilning railway station (National Rail station code: PIL), in South Gloucestershire, England
- Carlos Miguel Jiménez Airport (IATA Code: PIL), in Pilar, Paraguay
- Port Isabel-Cameron County Airport (FAA Code: PIL), in Port Isabel, Texas

== Other ==
- Pacific International Lines, a Singapore-based shipping company
- Page Interchange Language
- Patient information leaflet
- Pil (chess), or alfil, a fairy chess piece
- Portland Interscholastic League, a high school athletic conference in Oregon
- Protic ionic liquid
- Python Imaging Library
- Old Style Pilsner, often known as Pil
