= Genesis X Speedium Coupe =

Concept automobile

The Genesis X Speedium Coupe (Korean: 제네시스 엑스 스피디움 쿠페) is a concept vehicle built by Genesis Motor, the luxury sub-brand of Hyundai Motor Company.

== Design ==
The Genesis X Speedium Coupe was premiered by Genesis at Genesis House New York on April 13, 2022. The Genesis X Speedium Coupe was born out of a freestyle design exercise based on the Genesis X Concept. The name Speedium was inspired by the Korean racetrack in the city of Inje and the passion for motorsport.

On the front of the car, Genesis’ signature Two Lines lamps have evolved into a full-width element that encompasses the shape of the crest resembling the Genesis Crest Grille. It was designed to carry the brand signature of the wing face for the electrification era by integrating the daytime running lamps with the low beam and high beam together. Viewed from the side, the Parabolic Line extending from the front to the rear of the car maintains a certain tension. In addition, an elliptical tail balances out the look for a visually engaging tension between convex and concave surfaces in the rear. The V-shaped brake lights produce the contrast that is one of the hallmarks of a Genesis vehicle.

Inside, the curved OLED display was placed on the driver-oriented cockpit. The vertical display with a touch-type UI design located on the right side of the driver's view can operate functions such as starting a vehicle and playing multimedia. Also, a sound system with multiple speakers such as floating center console, tweeter, midrange, woofer, and sub woofer was installed. Leather interiors were applied with vegetable leather processed with plant-derived ingredients and grain leather with less water and chemicals than regular leather. And X-shaped strap with a G-Matrix pattern was applied to the trunk.

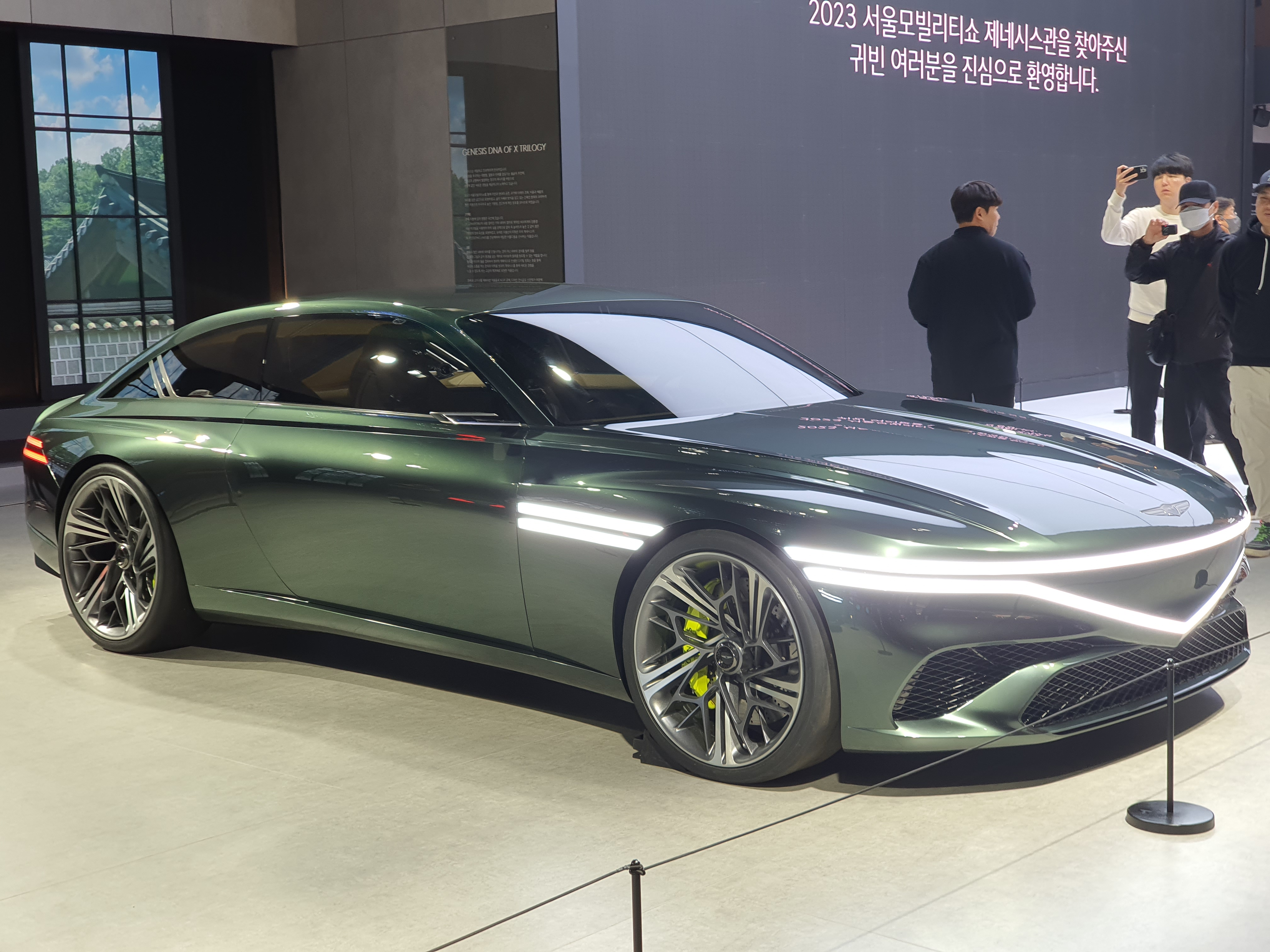
Front View

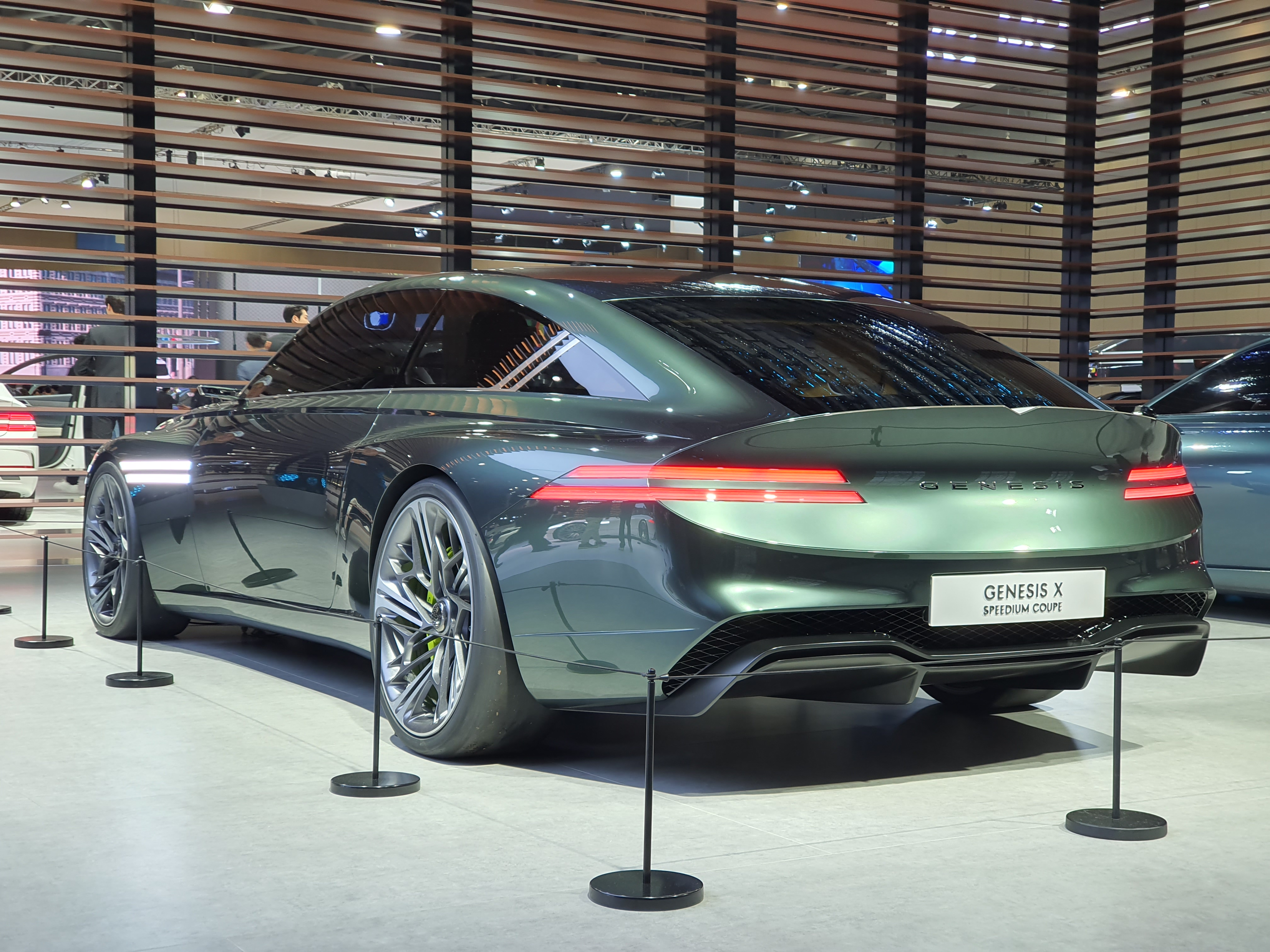
Rear View
