= Hyundai Pony =

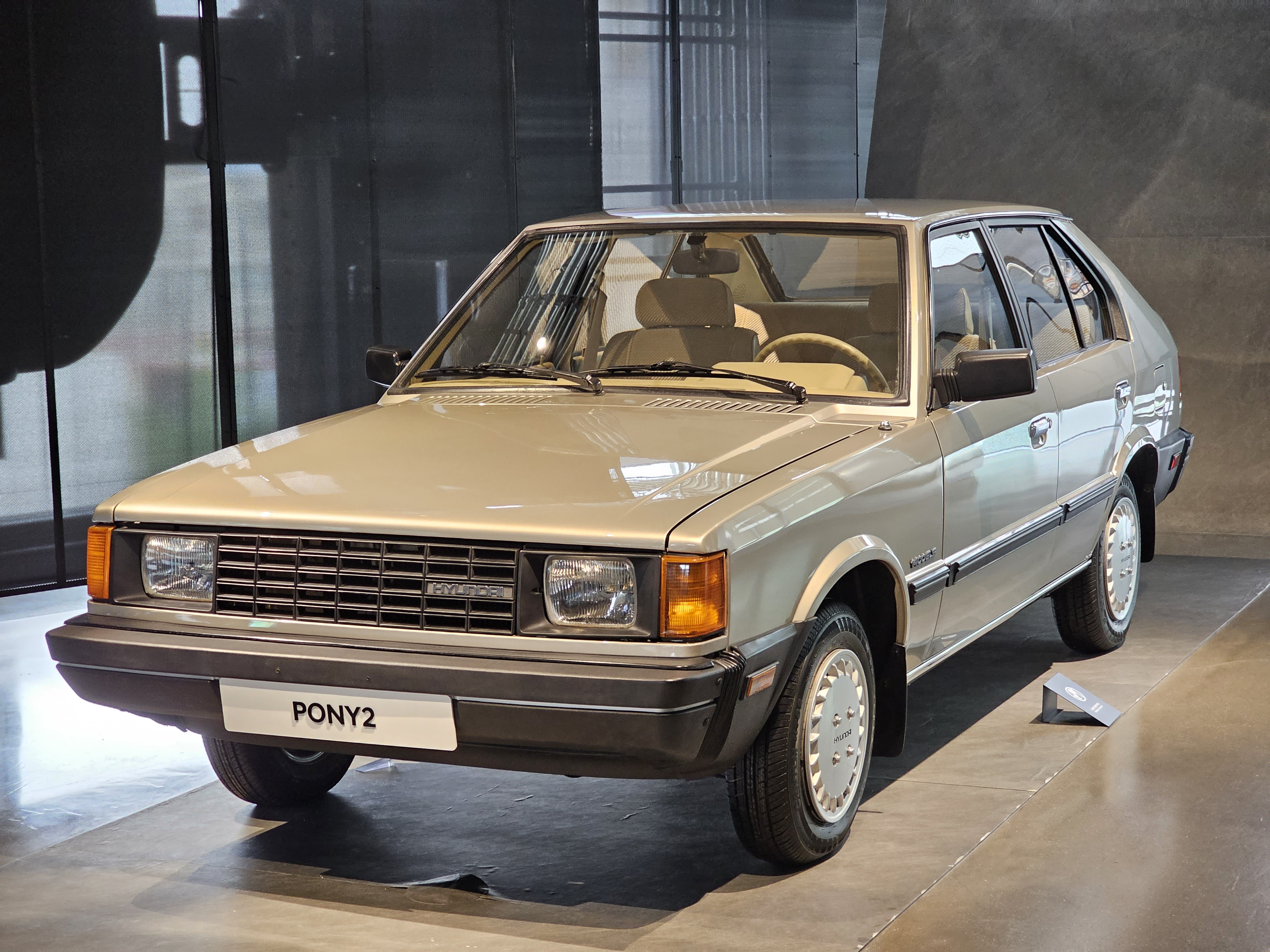
- Second generation Hyundai Pony liftback

Overview
- Manufacturer: Hyundai
- Production: 1975–1990
- Assembly: South Korea: Ulsan

Body and chassis
- Class: Subcompact car (B)
- Layout: FR layout

Chronology
- Successor: Hyundai Excel; Hyundai Elantra

The Hyundai Pony (Hangul: 현대 포니) is a small rear-wheel-drive automobile produced by the South Korean manufacturer Hyundai from 1975 until 1990. The Pony was South Korea's first mass-produced and exported car. It was made in two-door coupé utility, three-door liftback, four-door saloon car, and five-door liftback or estate car body styles. The Pony nameplate remained in use until 2000 on some export versions of the Hyundai Excel and Accent.

== Background ==
Hyundai had already ventured into car production by producing locally built versions of the Ford Cortina under licence from 1968. When the company wanted to develop their own car, they hired George Turnbull, the former managing director of Austin and Morris at British Leyland in 1974. He in turn hired five other top British car engineers, Kenneth Barnett as body designer, engineers John Simpson and Edward Chapman, John Crosthwaite as chassis engineer and Peter Slater as chief development engineer. With Turnbull's experience with the Morris Marina, engines and transmissions from Mitsubishi, platform from Mitsubishi's Lancer, some parts from the Ford Cortina they were already producing, and a hatchback body styled by Italdesign Giugiaro, they developed the Hyundai Pony.

== First generation (1975) ==
First generation
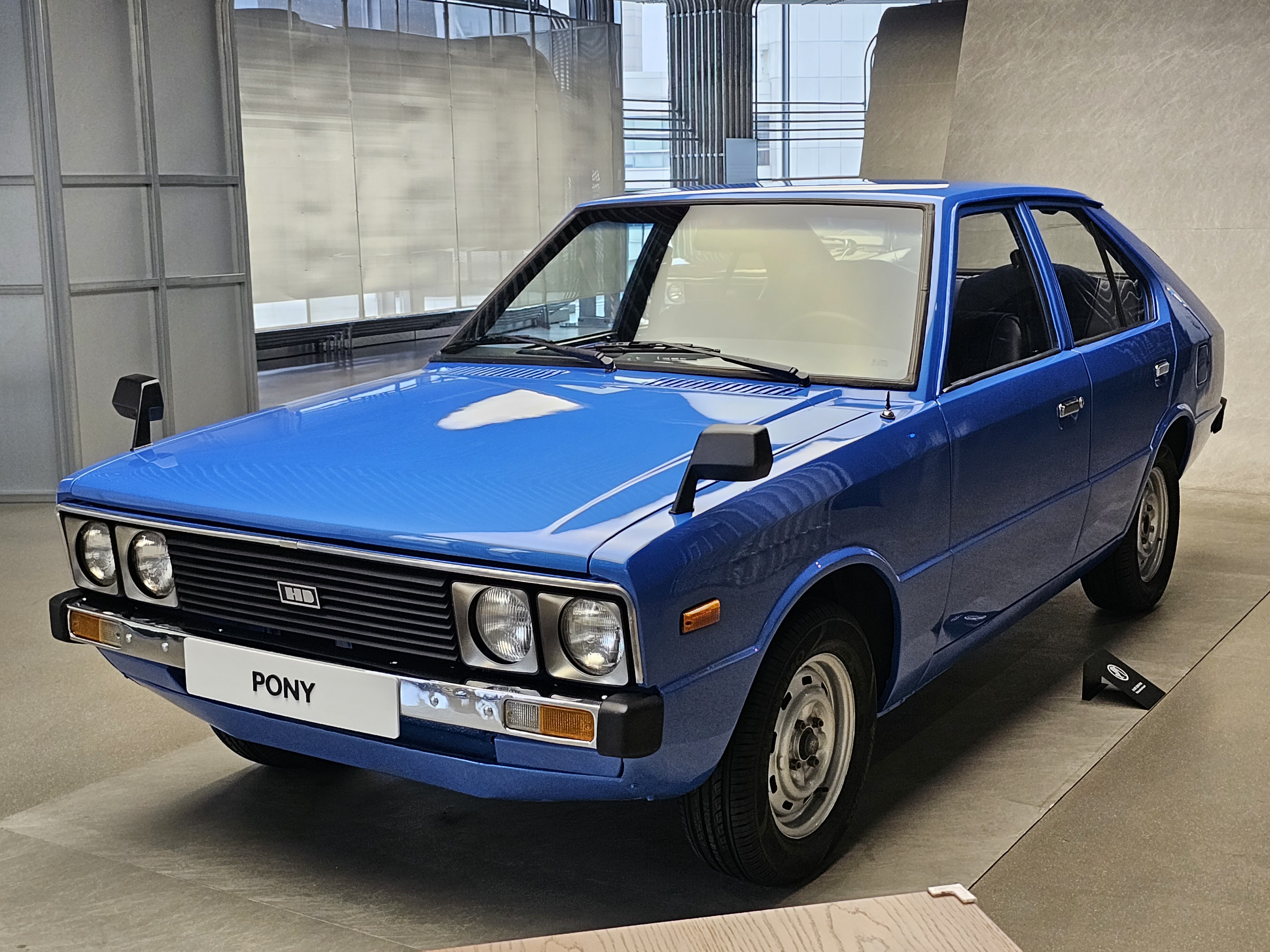
- Hyundai Pony sedan (South Korea)

Overview
- Production: December 1975 – February 1982 (until December 1985 for taxi usage); 297,903 units
- Designer: Giorgetto Giugiaro at Italdesign

Body and chassis
- Body style: 2-door coupé utility 3/5-door liftback 4-door saloon 5-door estate

Powertrain
- Engine: 1.2 L Mitsubishi 4G36 I4; 1.2 L Mitsubishi 4G36 LPG I4 (Taxi model, 1975–1985); 1.4 L Mitsubishi 4G33 I4; 1.4 L Mitsubishi 4G33 LPG I4 (Taxi model, 1978–1985); 1.6 L Mitsubishi 4G32 I4
- Transmission: 4-speed manual 3-speed automatic

Dimensions
- Wheelbase: 2,340 mm (92.1 in)
- Length: 3,970 mm (156.3 in); 3,998 mm (157.4 in) (estate)
- Width: 1,558 mm (61.3 in)
- Height: 1,360 mm (53.5 in)
- Curb weight: 870–935 kg (1,918–2,061 lb)

The Pony was presented as a coupé concept car at the Turin Motor Show in October 1974, and the car was introduced in December 1975 as a four-door saloon car to compete with the Saehan Gemini and Kia Brisa. A coupé utility version was added in May 1976, which was called a pickup, although it differed from a typical pickup truck in that its cargo tray was integral with the body rather than being a separate assembly. An estate car arrived in April 1977. In 1981, the small boot lid from the saloon was replaced by a hatchback tail gate creating a new five-door liftback model. This was accompanied with a new three-door liftback. The Pony was loosely based on both the earlier licence-built Ford Cortinas and the Morris Marina, with former British Leyland engineers being hired by Hyundai to design the car.

Hyundai began exporting the Pony to Chile, Argentina, Colombia, Ecuador and Egypt in 1976. European exports began in 1979 with Belgium and the Netherlands, with Greece added shortly thereafter. The pickup version was added in October that year, only available with the smaller, 1.2-litre (73 cu in), engine and a 380 kg (838 lb) payload.

The 1,238-cubic-centimetre (75.5 cu in) four-cylinder engine claimed 55 PS (40 kW) and the 1,439-cubic-centimetre (87.8 cu in) engine produced 68 PS (50 kW). The 1.4 GLS was tested by the British car magazine Motor and top speed was 92 mph with acceleration from 0–60 mph in 15.3 seconds.

=== Lineup ===
- 1200: GLS/GL/Standard (UK: T, L, TL, GL)
- 1400: GLS/GL (UK: TL, GL, TLS, GLS)
- 1600: GLS/GL/Limited (not in all markets)
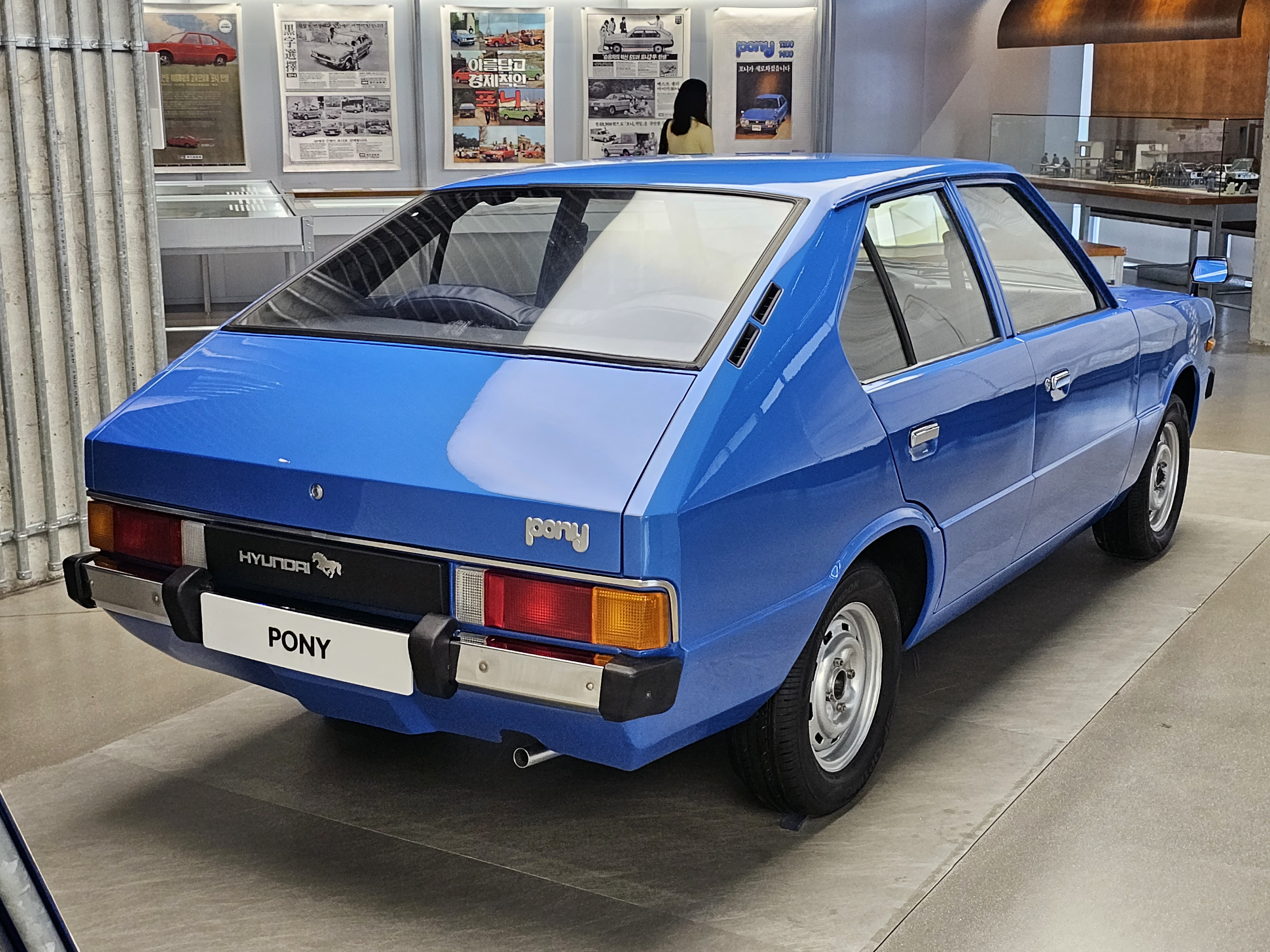
Hyundai Pony saloon (South Korea)

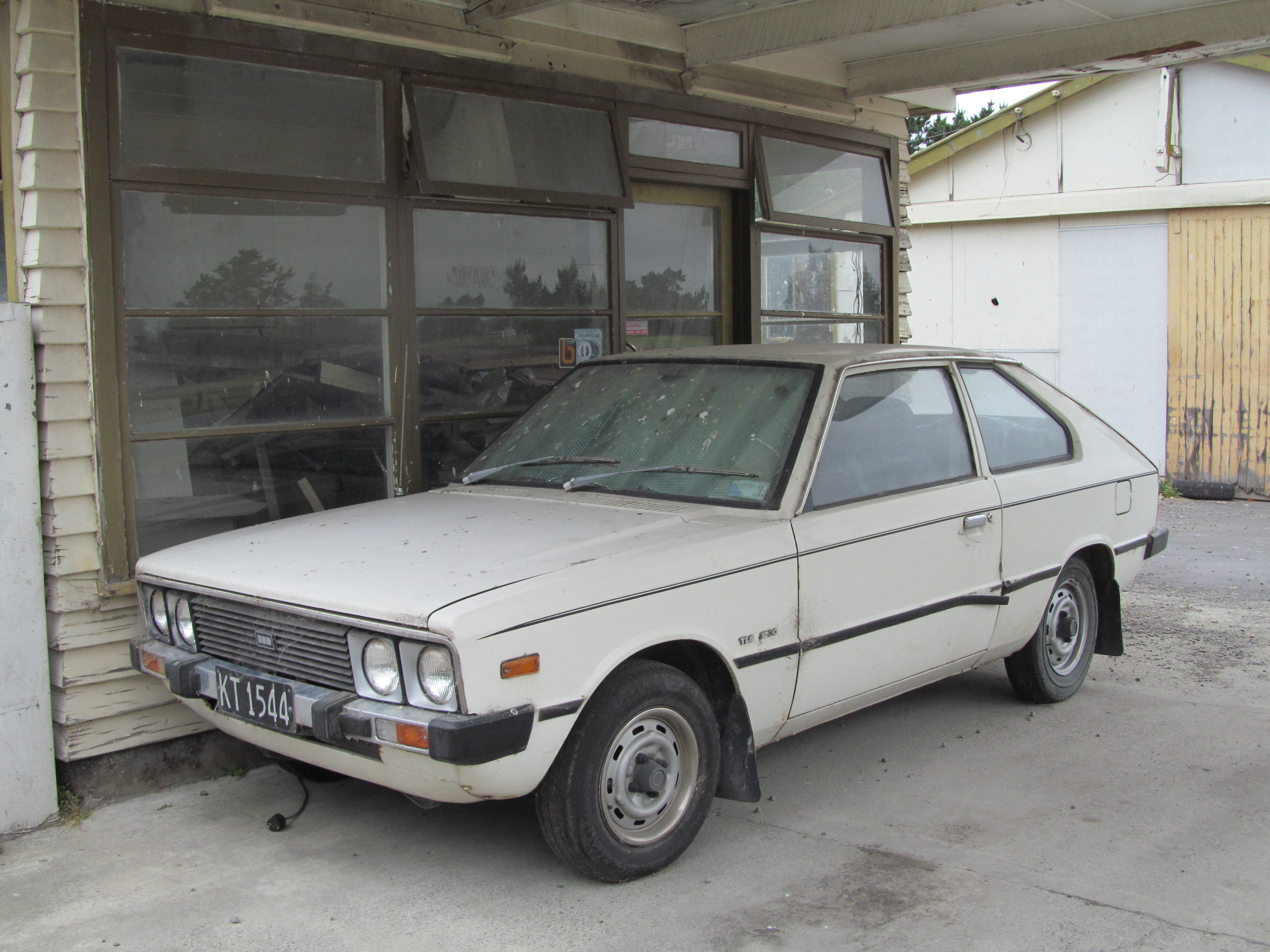
Hyundai Pony 3-door liftback (New Zealand)

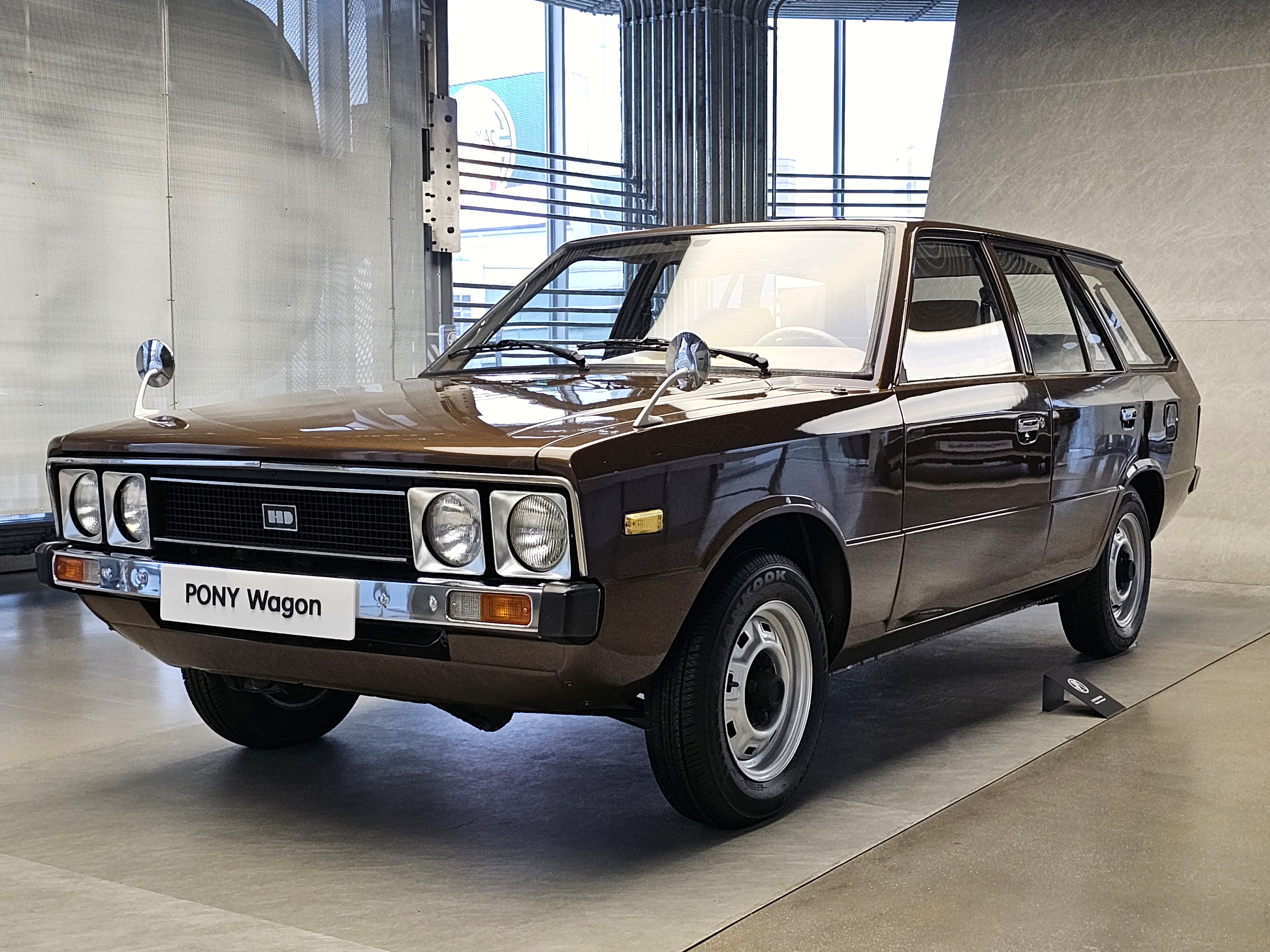
Hyundai Pony estate (South Korea)

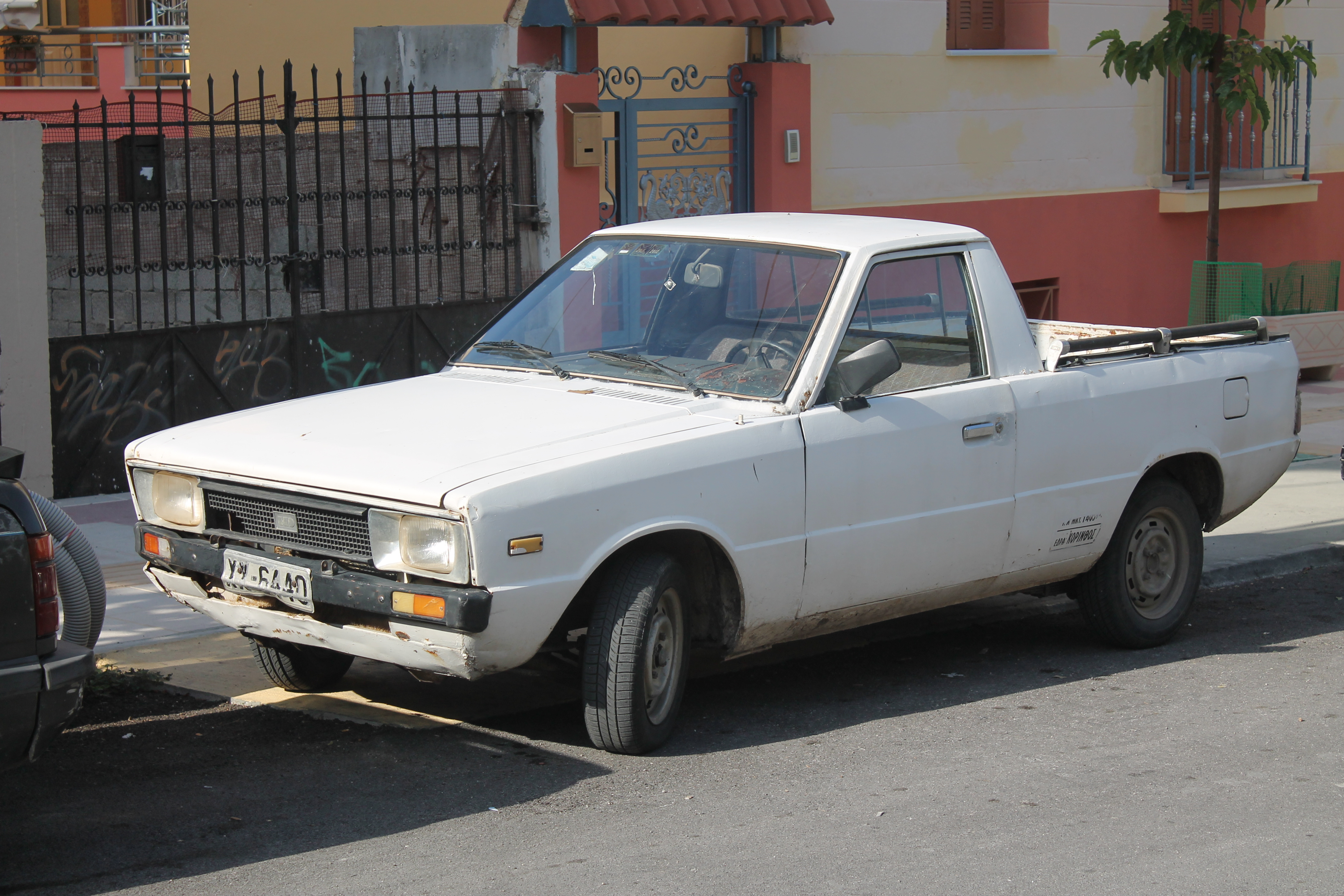
Hyundai Pony pickup (Greece)

== Second generation (1982) ==
Second generation
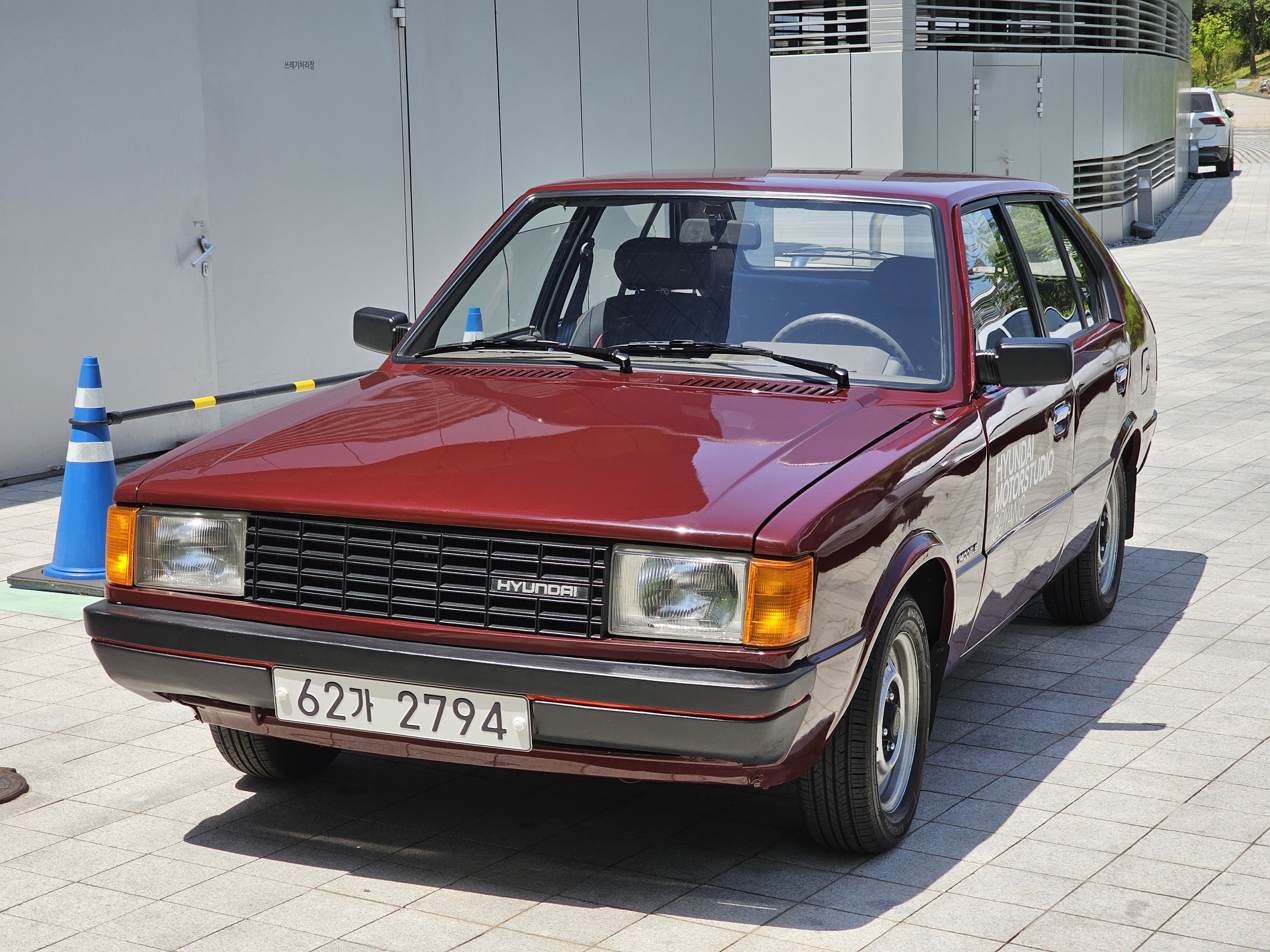
- Second generation Hyundai Pony Liftback

Overview
- Production: February 1982 – April 1988 (until January 1990 for pickup and taxi models)

Body and chassis
- Body style: 2-door coupé utility; 5-door liftback

Powertrain
- Engine: 1.2 L Mitsubishi 4G36 I4; 1.2 L Mitsubishi 4G36 LPG I4 (Taxi model, 1982–1987); 1.4 L Mitsubishi 4G33 I4; 1.4 L Mitsubishi 4G33 LPG I4 (Taxi model, 1982–1987); 1.5 L Mitsubishi 4G31 LPG I4 (Taxi model, 1987–1990); 1.6 L Mitsubishi 4G32 I4
- Transmission: 4-speed manual 3-speed automatic

Dimensions
- Wheelbase: 2,340 mm (92.1 in)
- Length: 4,029 mm (158.6 in) (hatchback); 4,184 mm (164.7 in) (Canada)
- Width: 1,566 mm (61.7 in)
- Height: 1,355 mm (53.3 in) (hatchback); 1,367 mm (53.8 in) (Canada)
- Curb weight: 920–1,015 kg (2,028–2,238 lb)

Introduced in January 1982, the Pony II was similar mechanically to the first-generation version, but was extensively restyled. Only the five-door Liftback and two-door pickup were offered.

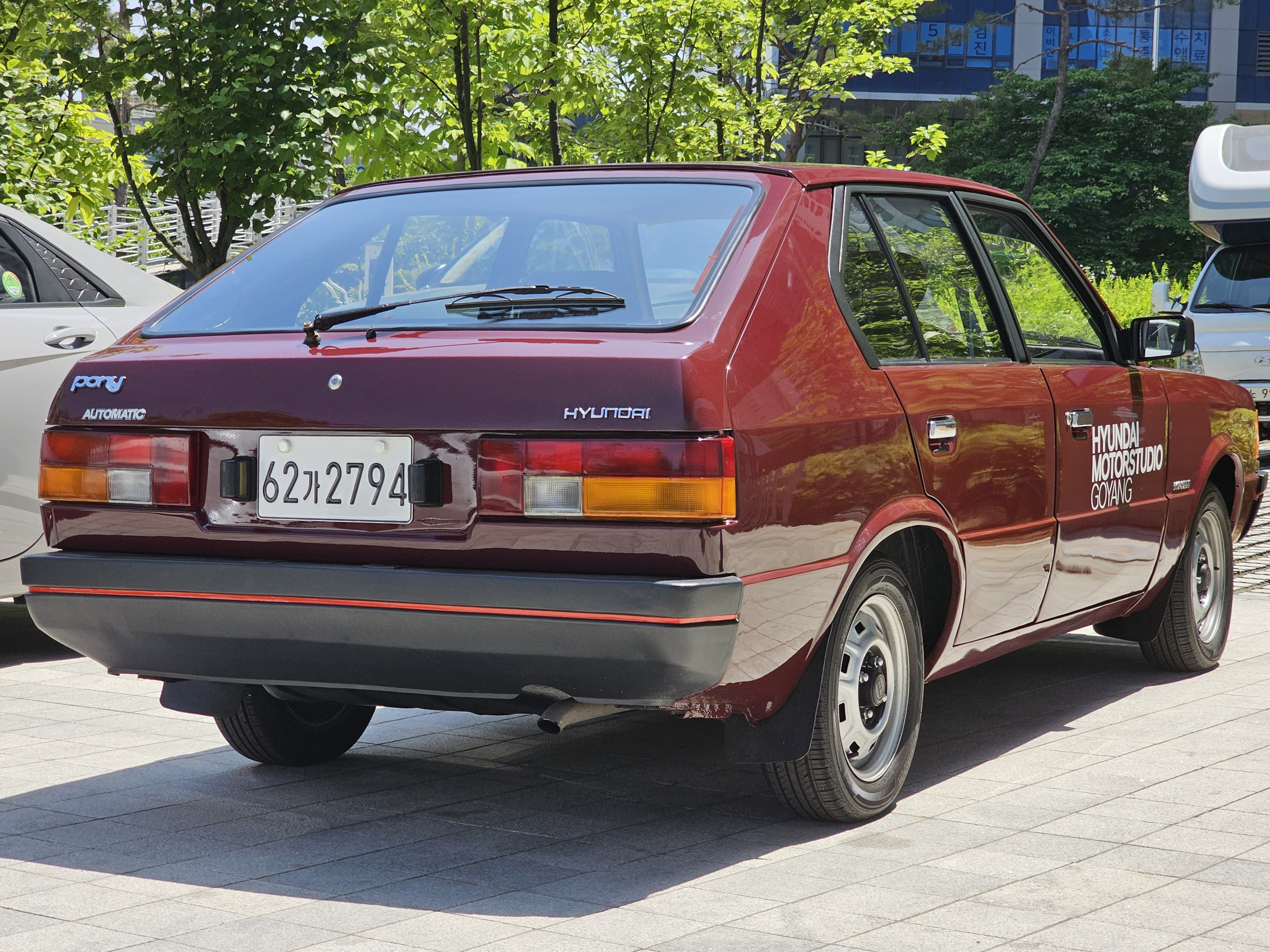
Rear View

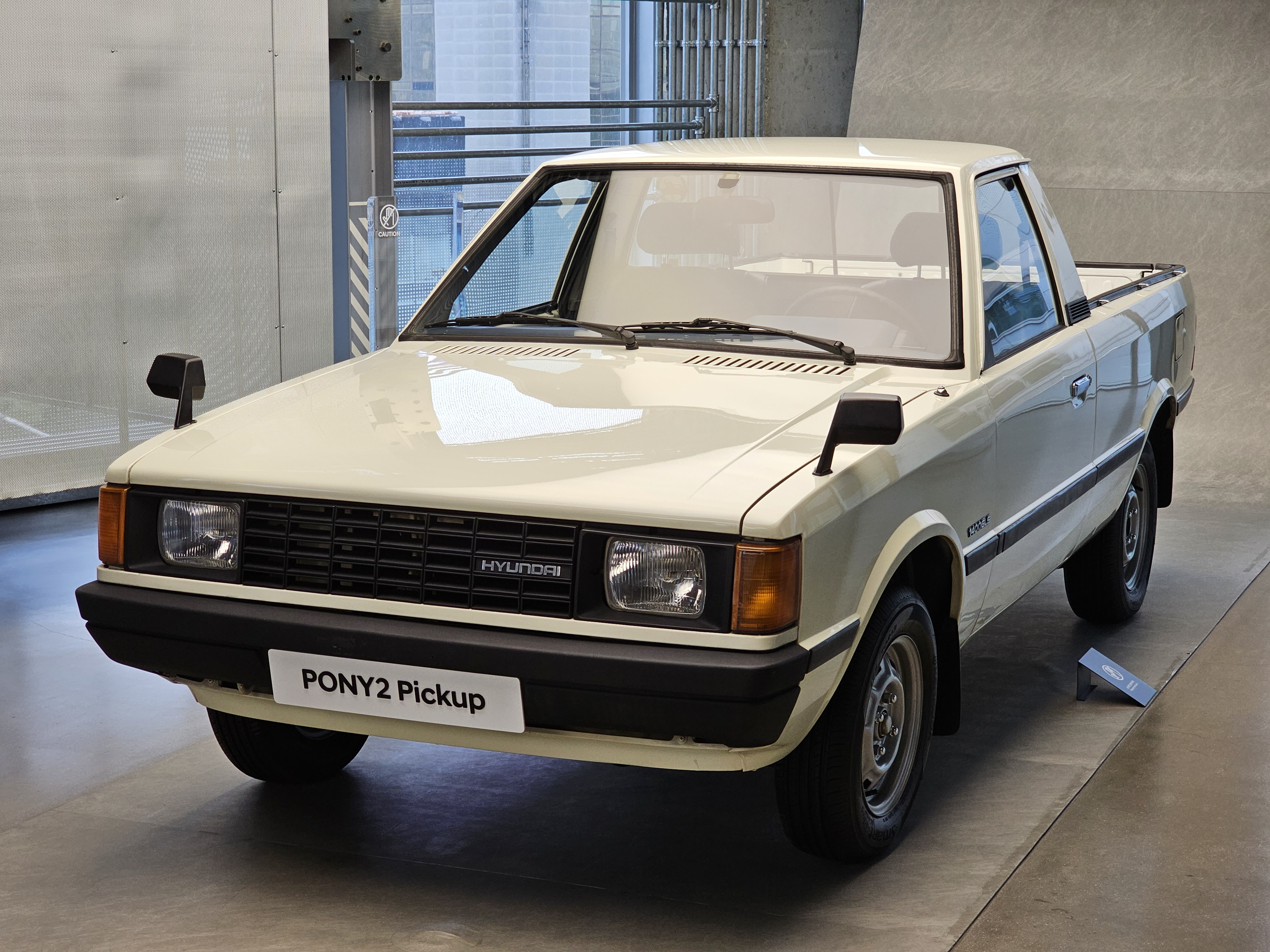
Hyundai Pony Pickup (Front View)

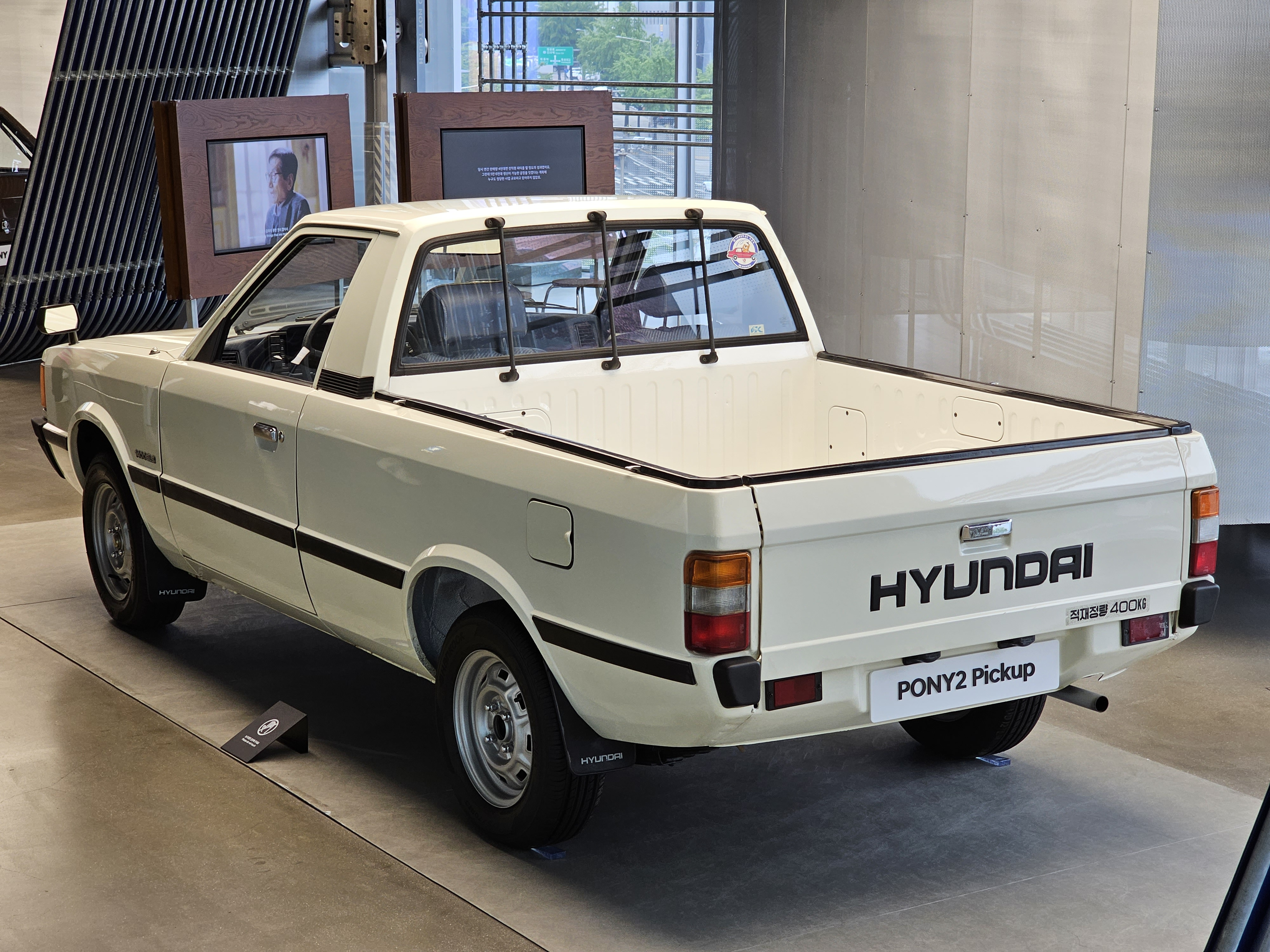
Hyundai Pony Pickup (Rear View)

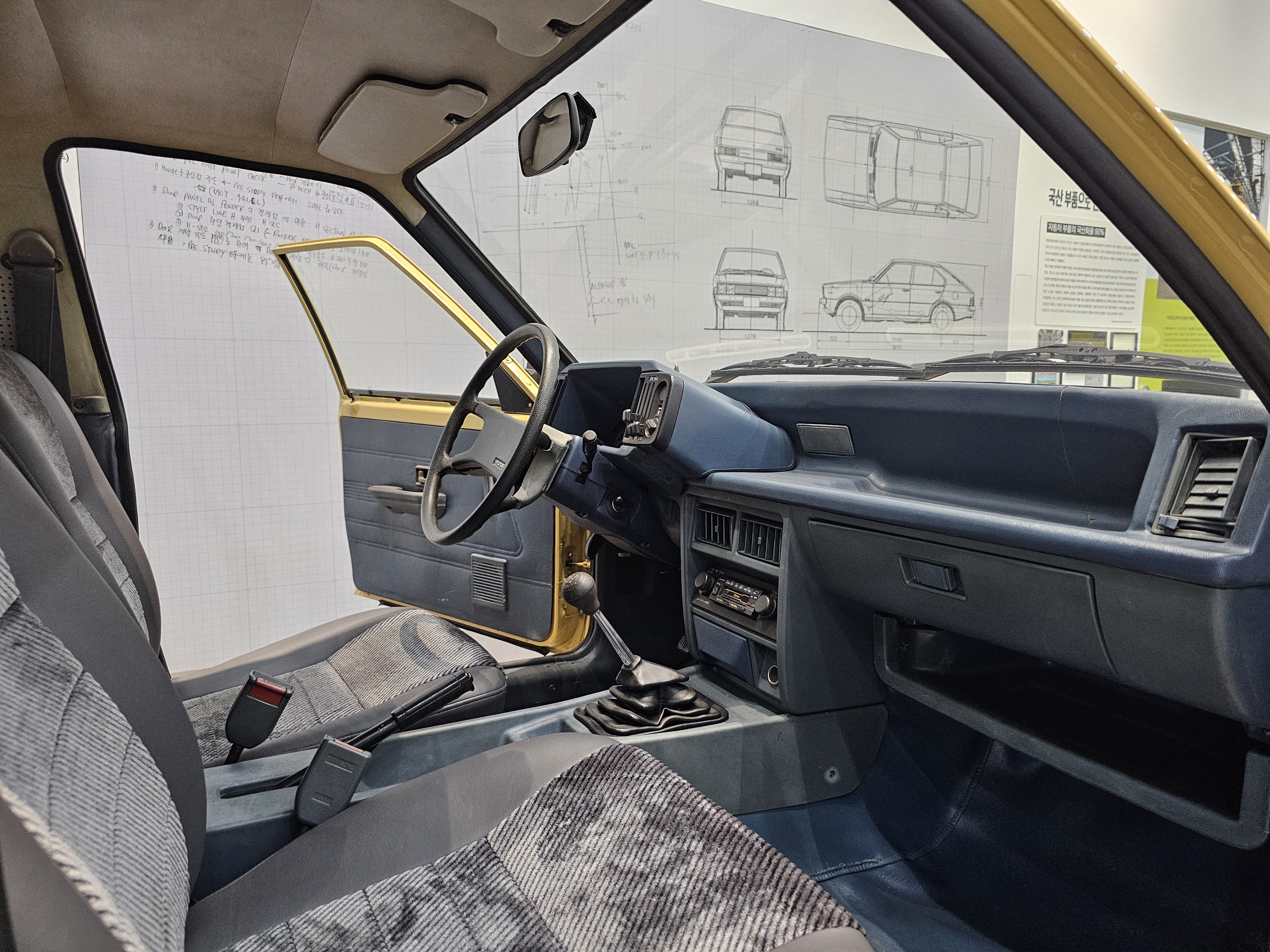
Interior

With the Pony II, exports also began to the UK in the spring of 1982 – making it the first South Korean car to be sold there. Initially, the Pony was positioned as a budget offering between Eastern Bloc brands (Lada, Skoda) and the lower echelons of established Japanese makes for sales, marking the beginning of a successful foray into this market by Korean carmakers.

=== Engine types ===
For 1984, the Pony came only with a 1,439-cubic-centimetre (87.8 cu in) 4G33 Mitsubishi straight-four engine, rated at 70 horsepower (52 kW) and 82 pound-feet (111 N⋅m) of torque. This engine was available with either a four-speed or five-speed manual or a three-speed automatic transmission. The 1,238-cubic-centimetre (75.5 cu in) 4G36 engine was not available in Canada. This engine was retained across the line until 1986, after which only the 1,597-cubic-centimetre (97.5 cu in) 4G32 engine (74 horsepower (55 kW) and 93 pound-feet (126 N⋅m) of torque) was available. In mid-1985, the door handles were blacked out, chrome was removed from the windshield wipers, and the "HD" badge was removed from the centre of the grille and replaced with the lettering "Hyundai" off to the left side. A 1.6-litre (98 cu in) model 4G32 engine became available in 1985, with optional air conditioning. These powerplants had a hemispherical crossflow cylinder head, two valves per cylinder (chain-driven SOHC), a two-barrel downdraft carburettor (manual choke) and breaker point-type ignition.

=== Trim levels ===
Trim levels were 'L' (standard), 'GL/CX', and 'GLS/CXL'. The 'CX/CXL' designations were for 1987 model years only. The L featured vinyl seats, a fold-down rear bench seat, and usually a four-speed manual transmission mated to a 1.4-litre (85 cu in) inline-four engine. The GL/CX included vinyl-cloth seats, a standard clock (which was mounted in the instrument cluster for 1984–1986 models, and for 1987, a digital clock was added in the centre of the upper dash) rear wiper, passenger-side mirror, tinted glass, lockable fuel door, standard door guards, 50/50 fold-down seats, upgraded interior trim, and (from 1985) an available 1.6-litre (98 cu in) engine. The GLS/CXL included the above with the option of a tachometer, passenger-side vanity mirror, full cloth seats, and (from 1985) a standard 1.6 L engine.

Only the 'L' and 'CX' were trim levels for 1987. The 'L' was the same as the previous 'L', however the clock was now digital and the CX had a standard tachometer. From 1986 to 1987, interior colours available were tan or blue. From 1984 to 1985, it was light grey on dark grey. Options included rear window louvers, a front air dam, rear spoiler, GT package (which included a leather-wrapped Momo three-spoke steering wheel), tachometer, different trim and badging, fog lamps, and extra lights in the rear. All GTs came with the more powerful 1.6 engine. The Pony pickup was sold in Europe (only) until the end of the 1980s. The second generation Pony remained on sale until 1988 (until 1990 in South Korea). In some markets the Pony was replaced by a re-badged Hyundai Excel from 1985, particularly in Europe.

==== Lineup ====
- 1200: LE/L/GLX/GLS/GL/Standard
- 1400: GLS/GL/CX
- 1600: GLS/CX

=== Canadian-spec (Non-ECC LHD) ===
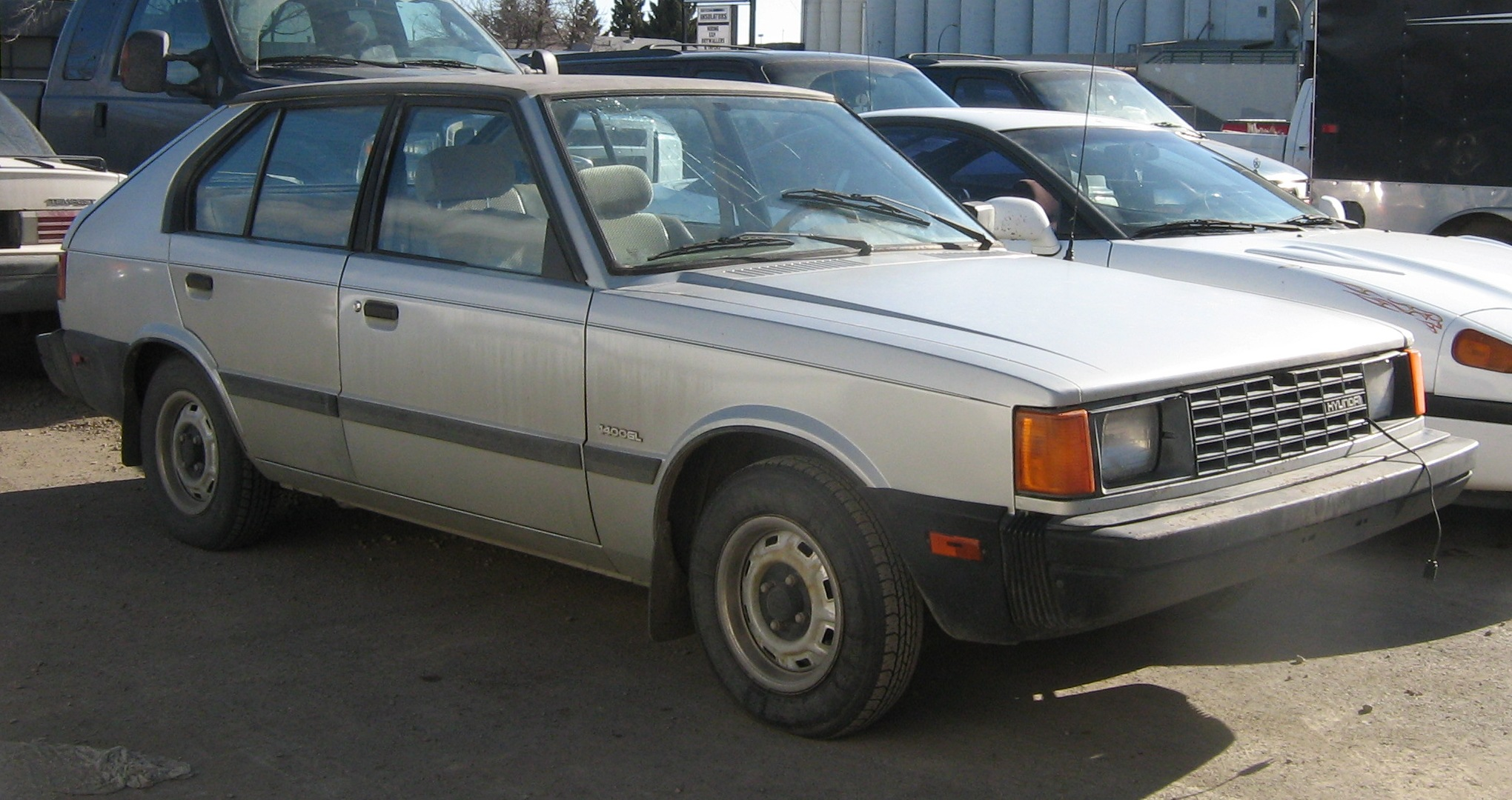
Canadian specification Hyundai Pony 1400 GLS

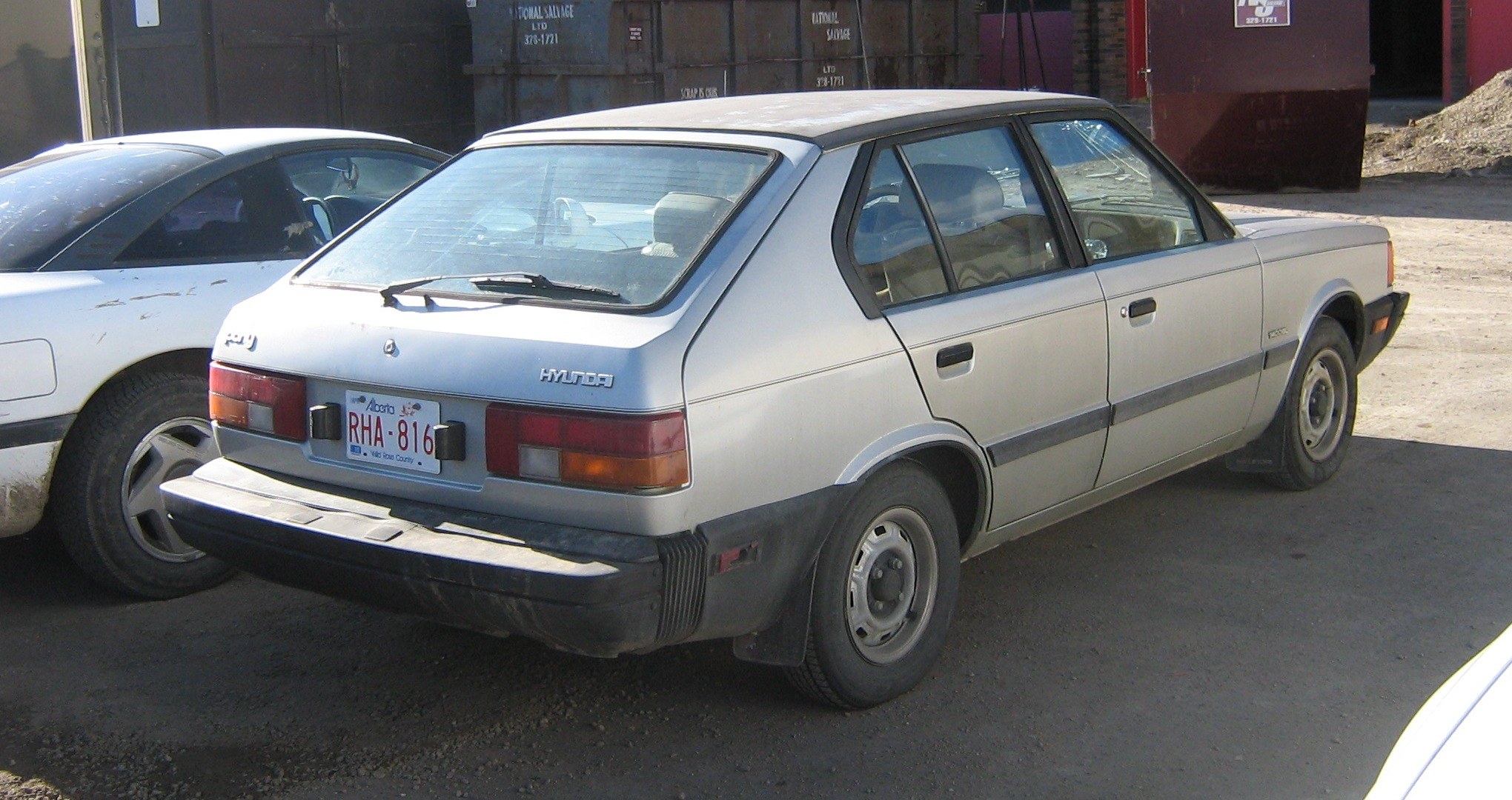
Canadian specification Hyundai Pony 1400 GLS

The Pony II was exported to Canada from 1983, where it was one of the least expensive vehicles on the market, and sales greatly exceeded expectations; initial projections for 1984 called for 5,000 sales, but the final total was 25,123, making it one of the top-selling vehicles in that country. The Pony was released for sale in Canada for the 1984 model year and sales ended in 1987. The Pony was sufficiently popular there that it was sold alongside the Excel until 1987 rather than being replaced by that vehicle as was done in some other markets. The Canadian version of the Pony was modified to meet local standards. Differences between the Canadian Pony versus its European counterparts were 8-kilometre-per-hour (5.0 mph) bumpers, sealed-beam headlights, side marker lamps instead of indicator repeaters (also in a lower position), and slight alterations in interior instrumentation and trim application.

== Other models ==
=== Pony Coupé Concept ===
The Pony Coupé Concept was designed by Giorgetto Giugiaro at Italdesign and first shown at the 1974 Turin Motor Show. According to Italdesign, the styling exercise was not performed under commission from Hyundai, but that company's executives asked to brand the concept as a Hyundai just before the opening of the Turin show. After the positive reception in Turin, the concept Coupé was imported to Korea and featured in domestic advertisements there; reverse engineering the concept began at the Hyundai Ulsan plant, and engineering drawings were made, but the Pony Coupé never reached mass production.

The styling of the Pony Coupé Concept went on to inspire both the DMC DeLorean and Hyundai N Vision 74 concept. The N Vision 74 is equipped with dual electric traction motors (both fitted to the rear axle) with a combined output of 670 hp (500 kW) and 664 lb⋅ft (900 N⋅m) of torque, drawing from a 62.4 kW-hr battery pack and hydrogen tanks storing 4.2 kg (9.3 lb) for an on-board fuel cell.

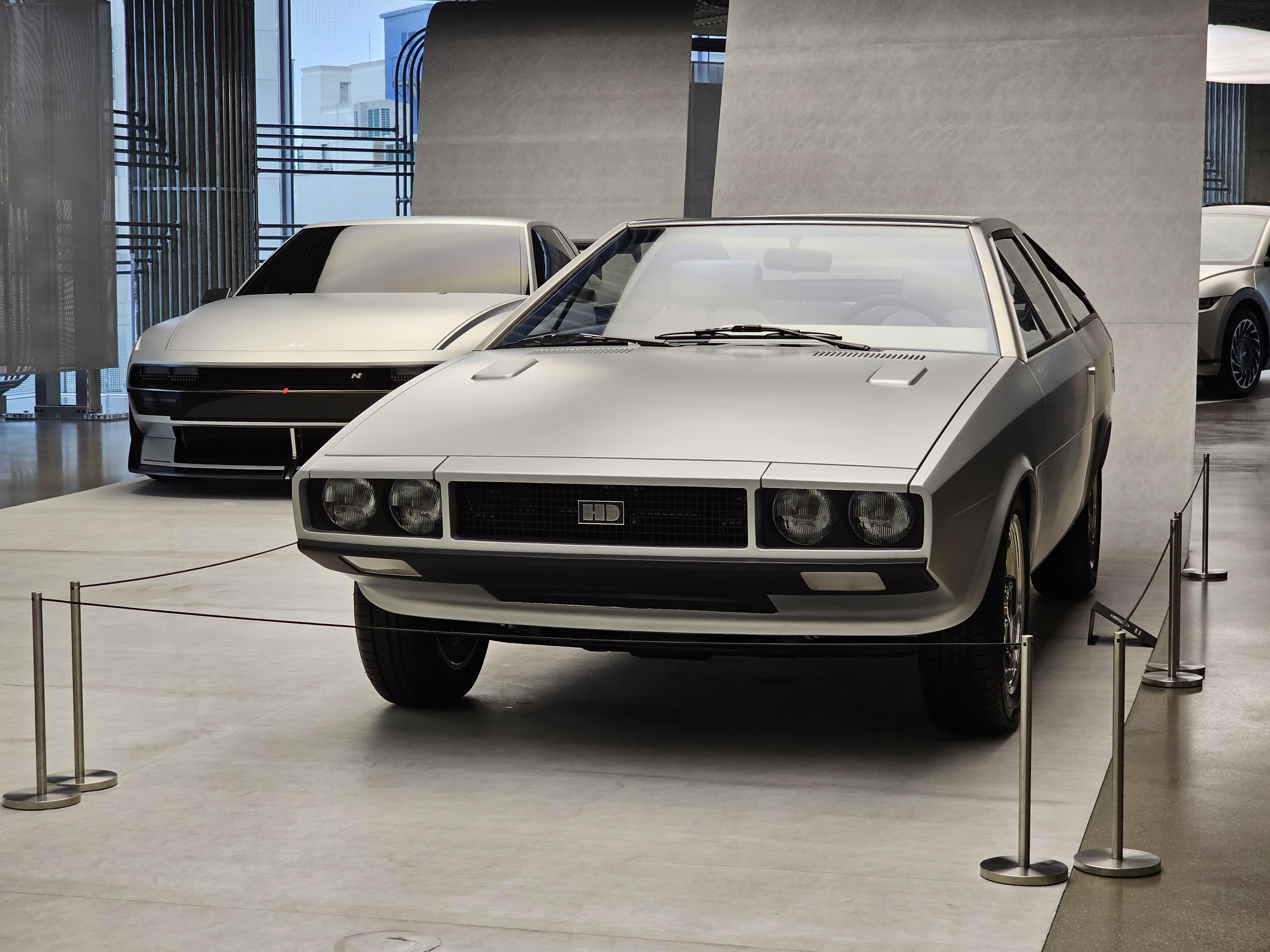
Front view

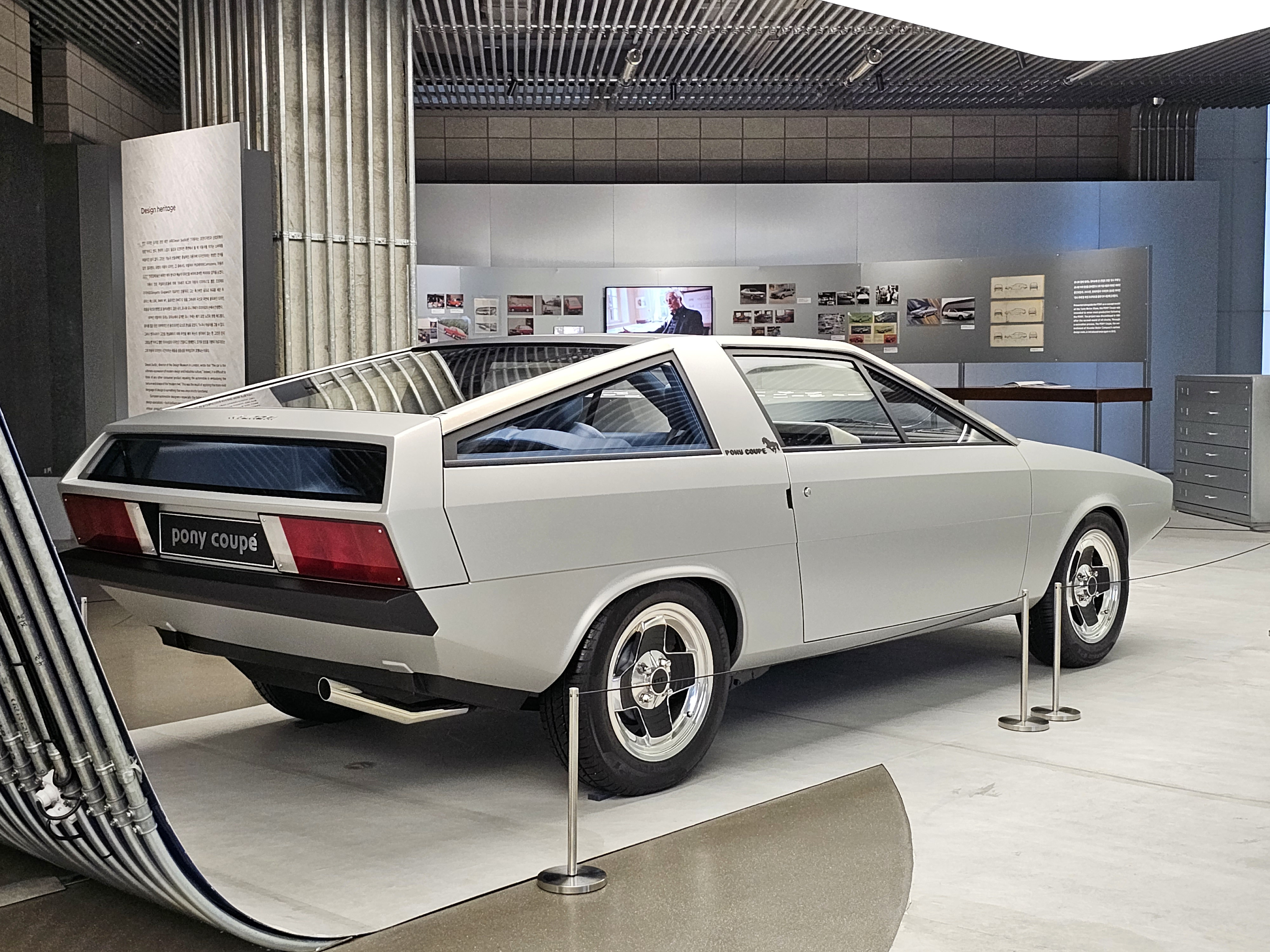
Rear view

=== Hyundai Excel ===
In Europe, the front wheel drive Hyundai Excel was sold under the Pony name from 1985 as a replacement for the rear wheel drive version. In other markets, the second generation Pony continued on sale alongside the new Hyundai Excel. Until discontinuation, Excel carried the Pony name.

- The first generation Excel (X1) was called Pony in Europe from 1985 to 1987, and the face-lifted model from 1987–1989 was called the Pony XP.
- For the second generation Excel (X2), the hatchback versions were called Pony in Europe.

The final usage of the name was with the first generation Hyundai Accent, sold as the Pony in France. The Pony name was last used by Hyundai in 2000.

=== Super Pony ===
For the second and third generations, some taxi models of the Hyundai Accent were sold as "Hyundai Super Pony". The fourth generation used the name "Grand Pony" instead.

=== Pony EV ===
In April 2021, Hyundai displayed the Pony Heritage EV, a restored first-generation Pony converted with an electric vehicle powertrain as a concept, in Hyundai Motorstudio Busan. The powertrain specifications were not available; the interior featured an instrument panel with two three-digit nixie tube displays for state of charge and vehicle speed. The head- and tail-lights feature a pixellated design which Hyundai have called "Pixel Road Trip" or "Parametric Pixel", reminiscent of 8-bit graphics and matching the design language applied to vehicles under its Ioniq sub-brand, including the contemporary Ioniq 5 production and 45 EV concept vehicles.

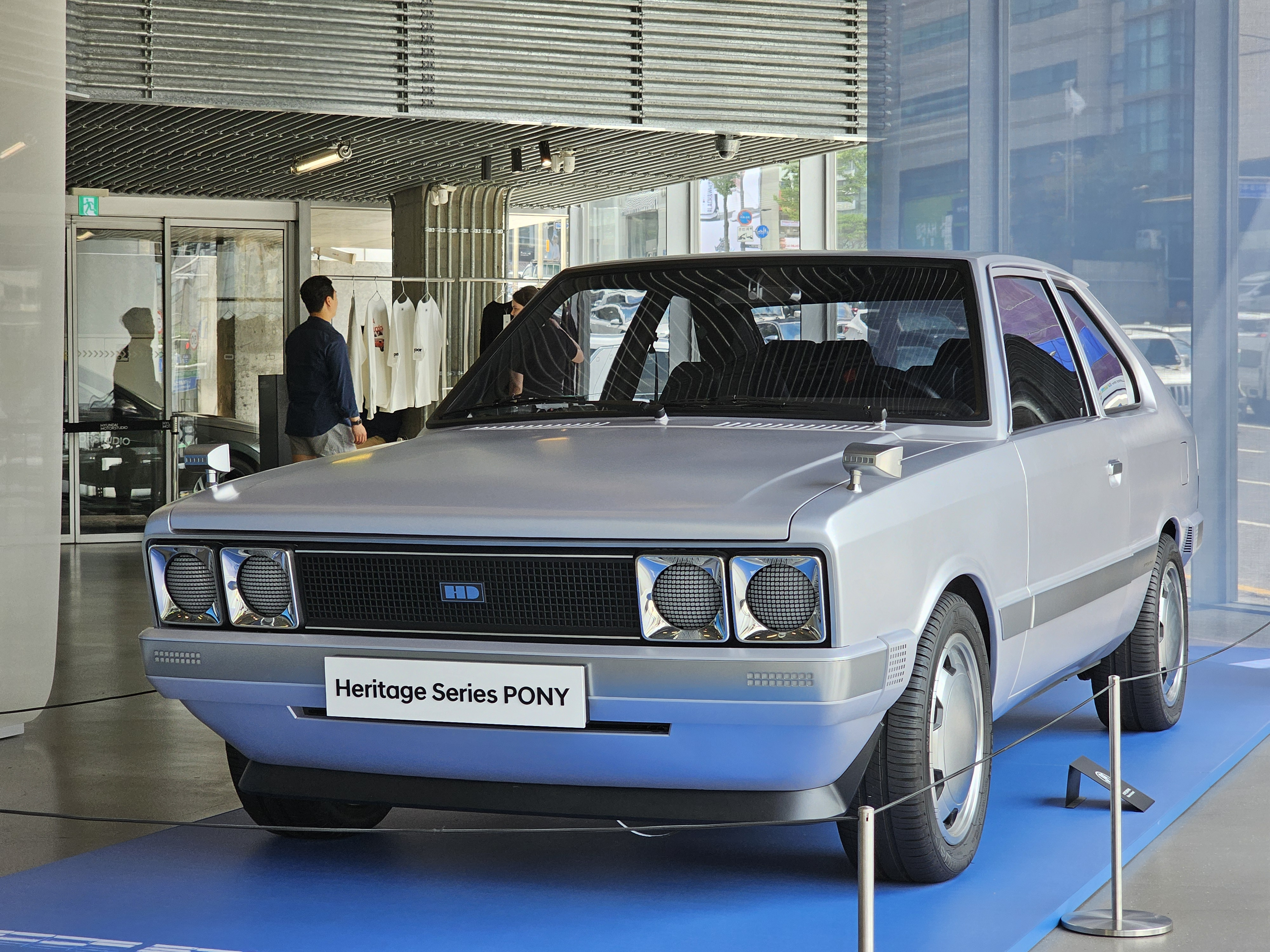
Front View

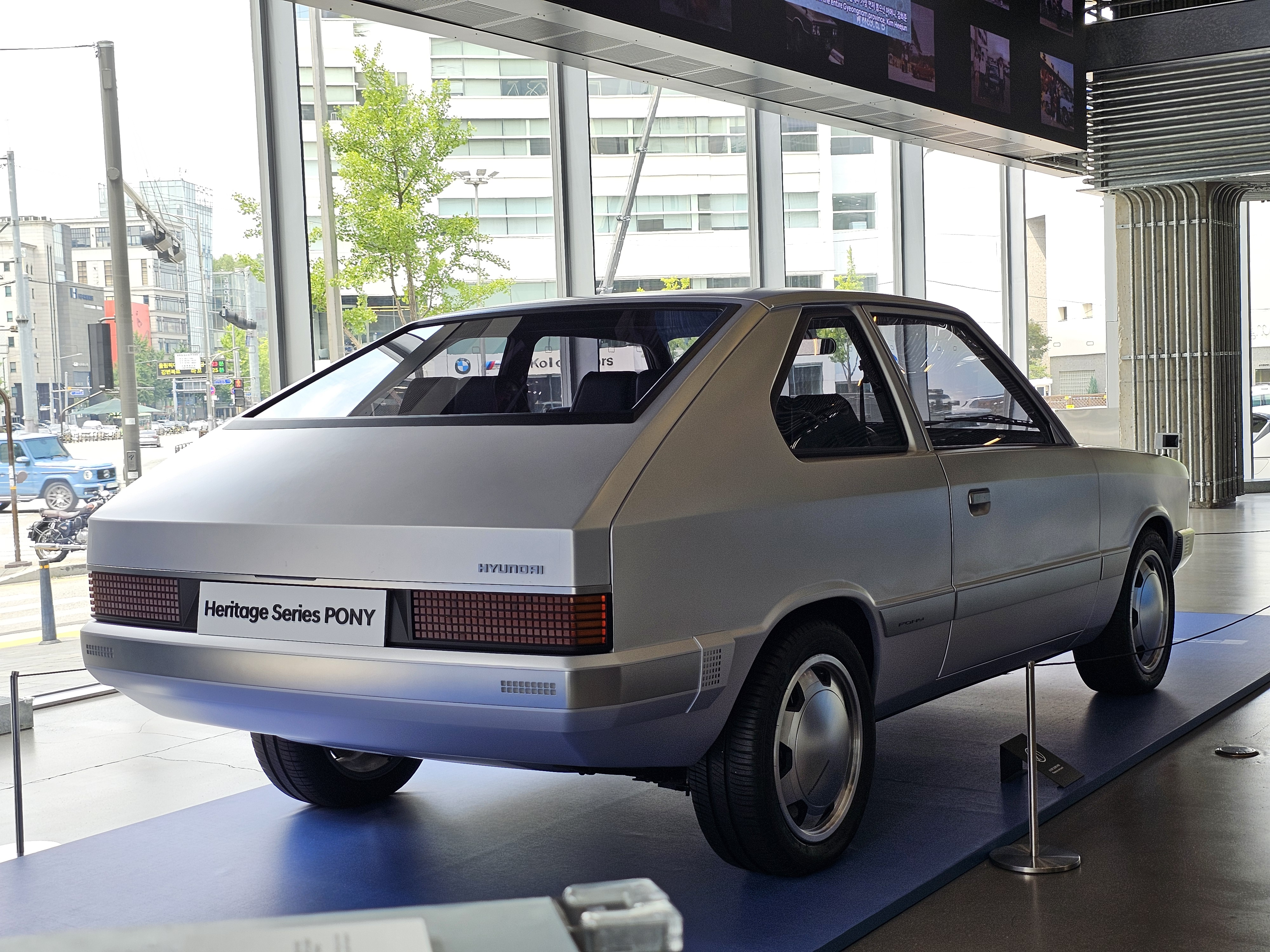
Rear View

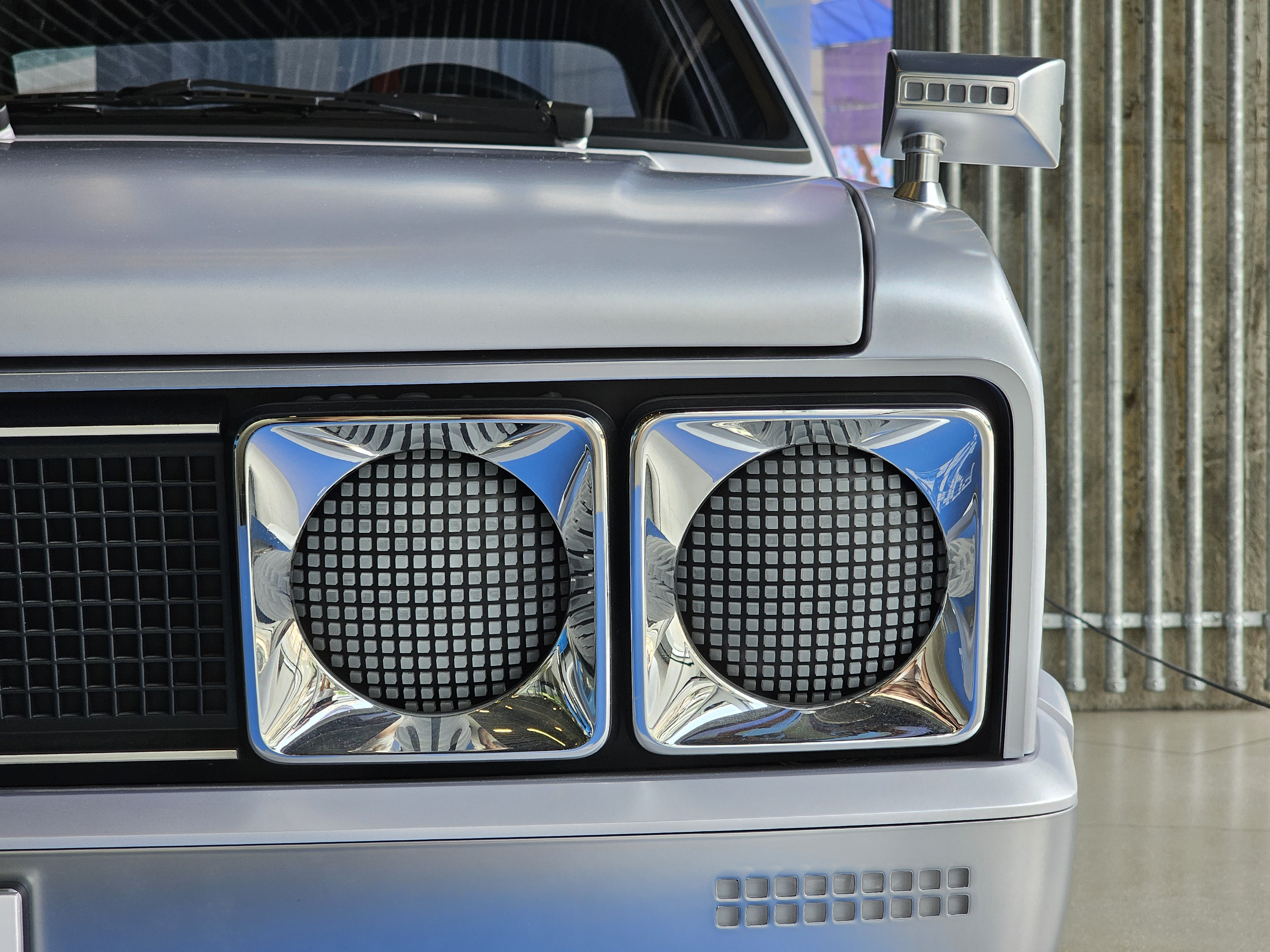
Headlight detail

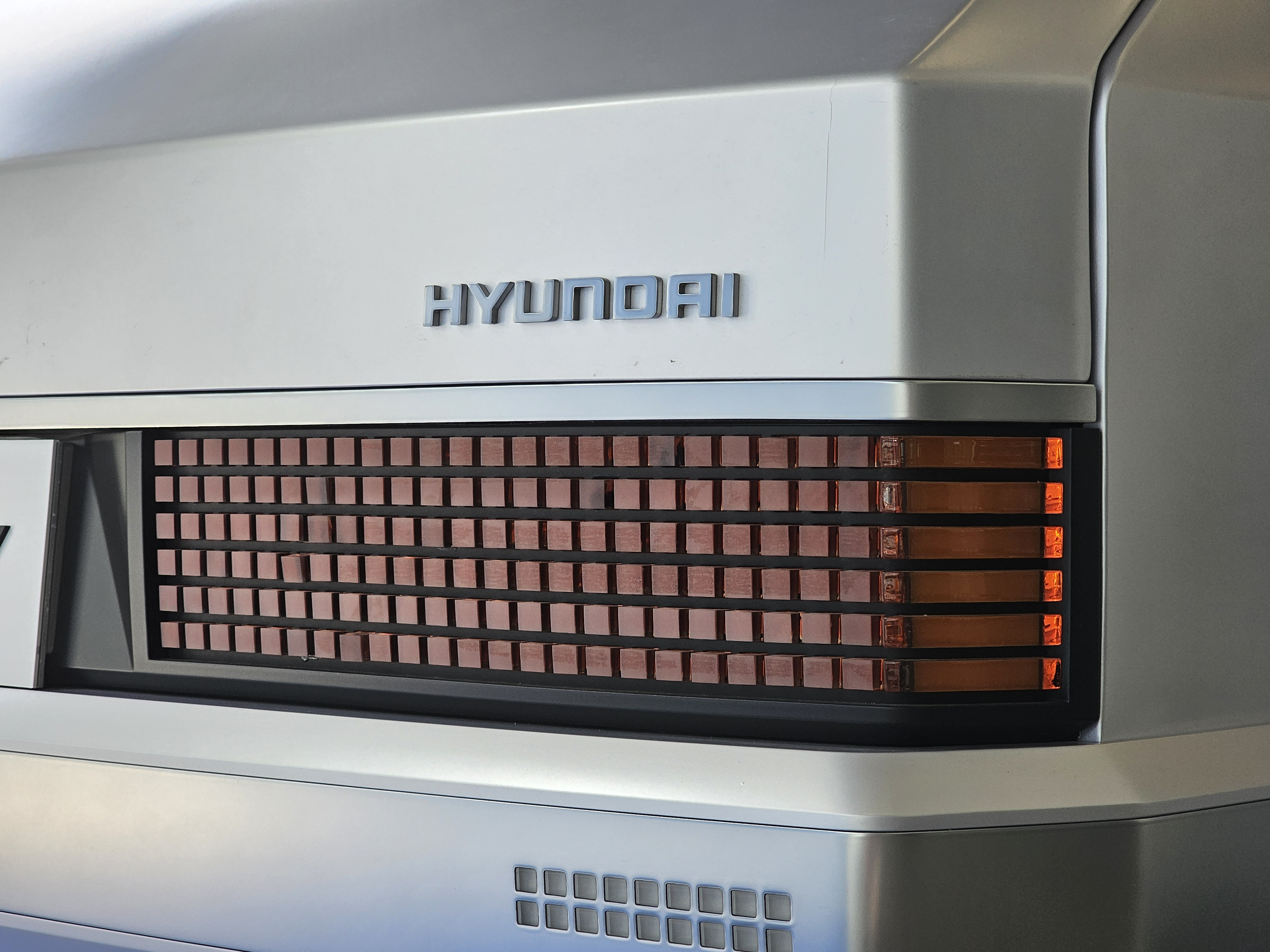
Taillight detail

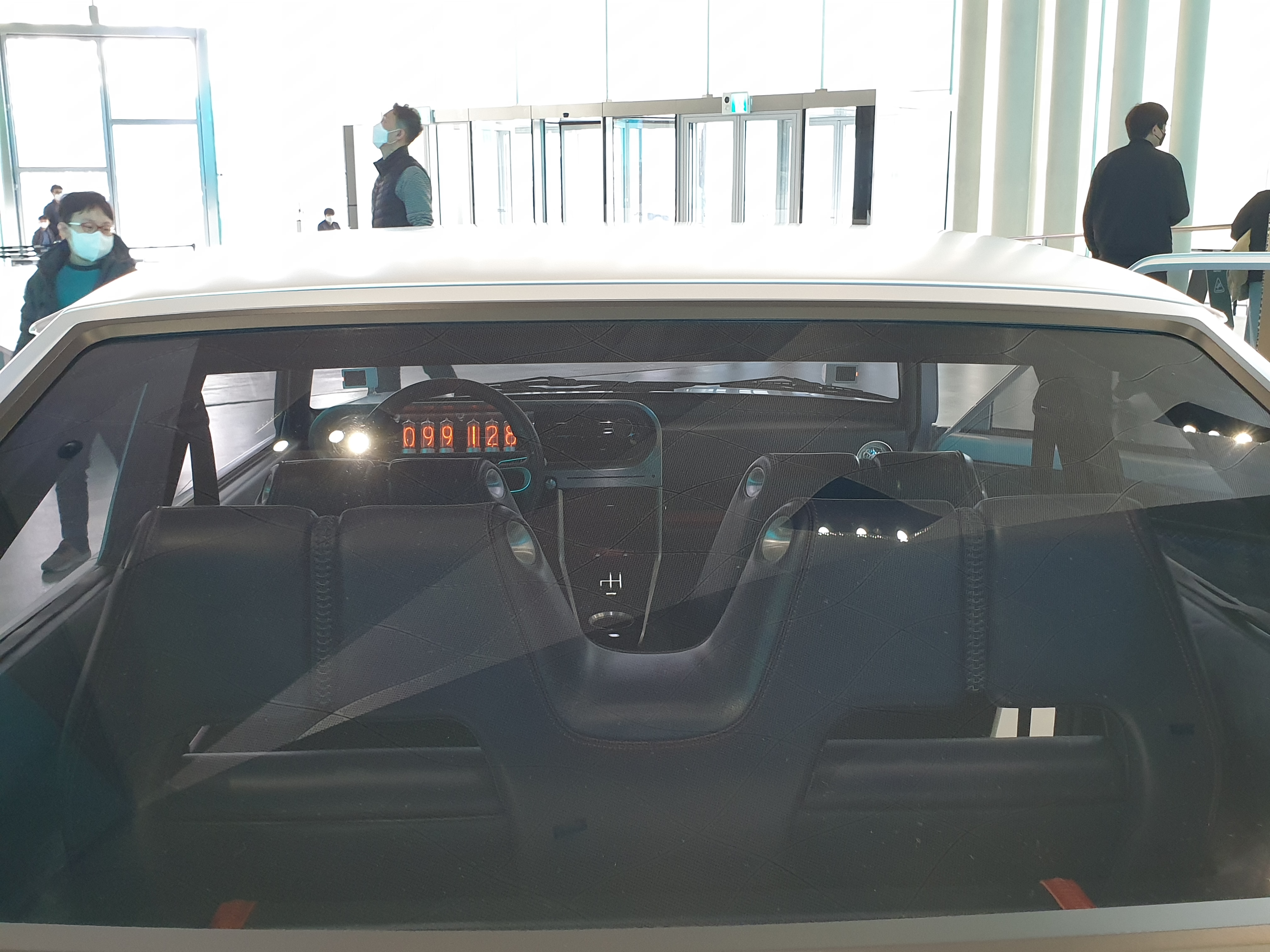
Interior and nixie tube display
