= PL =

PL, P.L., Pl, or .pl may refer to:

== Businesses and organizations ==
=== Government and political ===
- Partit Laburista, a Maltese political party
- Liberal Party (Brazil), a Brazilian political party
- Colombian Liberal Party, a Colombian political party, also referred to as the "Liberal Party"
- Liberal Party (Moldova), a Moldovan political party
- Liberal Party (Rwanda), a Rwandan political party
- Parlamentarische Linke, a parliamentary caucus in Germany
- Patriotic League (Bosnia and Herzegovina) (Bosnian: Patriotska Liga), a military organisation of the Republic of Bosnia and Herzegovina
- Philippine Legislature, a legislature that existed in the Philippines from 1907 to 1935
- Progressive Labor Party (United States), a United States communist party

=== Sports leagues ===
- Palestine League, the top Palestinian football league
- Premier League, the top English football league
- Pacific League, one of the two leagues in Japan's Nippon Professional Baseball
- Pioneer Baseball League, a Rookie league in American Minor League Baseball
- Pioneer Football League, NCAA FCS conference
- Priaulx League, senior football league on the island of Guernsey

=== Other businesses and organizations ===
- Airstars Airways (IATA airline designator PL, 2000–2011)
- Aeroperú (IATA airline designator PL, 1973–1999)
- Papillion-La Vista Senior High School in Papillion, Nebraska, USA
- Public library, a library maintained by government for public use
- Professional Limited Liability Company, a limited liability company organized for the purpose of providing professional services
- Planet Labs (NYSE symbol PL)

== Places ==
- PL postcode area, UK, a group of postcode districts in England
- Poland (ISO 3166-1 country code)

== Religion ==
- PL Kyodan, a religious movement founded in Japan in the early 20th century
- Patrologia Latina, a collection of Catholic writings published by Jacques-Paul Migne between 1841 and 1855

== Science, technology, and mathematics ==
=== Chemistry ===
- Pyridoxal, one form of vitamin B6
- Pulchellidin (Pl), an anthocyanidin
- Phospholipid, a class of lipids that are a major component of all cell membranes

=== Computing and telecommunications ===
==== File formats ====
- .pl, common filename suffix for Perl scripts
- .pl, common filename suffix for Prolog programs
- .pl, common filename suffix for TeX font property lists

==== Programming ====
- Programming language
  - PL/C, an instructional dialect of the PL/I computer programming language, developed at Cornell University in the 1970s
  - PL/I, a computer programming language developed in the 1960s
  - PL/SQL, Oracle's procedural language extension (inception in 1995)
  - PL/pgSQL, PostgreSQL's procedural language extension (inception 1998)

==== Telecommunication and networking ====
- .pl, country code top-level domain for Poland
- PL tone, a kind of squelching of an audio signal
- Packet loss, one of the three main error types encountered in digital communications
- Path loss, in telecommunication engineering
- Presentation layer, one of the seven layers in the OSI model of computer networking
- Digital Private Line, another form of tone squelching

=== Mathematics ===
- Piecewise linear (disambiguation), in mathematics
- Propositional logic, a system of evaluating truth-based propositions in terms of binary logic
- PL (complexity), in complexity theory

=== Other uses in science and technology ===
- Ice pellets (METAR weather code PL), a form of precipitation
- Picolitre (pL), and petaliter (PL), units of volume
- Pluto, a dwarf planet
- Photoluminescence, the re-emission of photons from a surface following exposure
- Pierre Levasseur (aircraft builder), a French aircraft designer
- Plastic limit, in geotechnical engineering
- PL / Positive Lock, a lens mount used on Arri cameras and lenses
- pl., abbreviation for printing plates, often indicating the number of plate-based illustrations in a book
- Adobe Prelude, an Adobe software

== Other uses ==
- Platoon leader, in the US Army
- Plural, in grammar
- Polish language (ISO 639-1 code "pl")
- Political Liberalism, a 1993 book by the American philosopher John Rawls
- Private label, an arrangement between companies regarding the exclusive sale of goods
- Public law
- Public liability
- Patrol Leader (Scouting)
