= Pie (disambiguation) =

A pie is a baked food, with a shell usually made of pastry.

PIE is an abbreviation of the Proto-Indo-European language, the reconstructed common ancestor of the Indo-European language family.

Pie or PIE may also refer to:

== People ==
- Pie (surname), people with this surname
- Pie Allen (1818–1899), American prospector, businessman, and politician
- Pie Corbett (born 1954), English educational writer and poet
- Pie Geelen (born 1972), Dutch freestyle swimmer
- Pié Masumbuko (born 1931), Burundian politician
- Pie Nizeyimana (born 1983), Rwandan politician
- Pie Ntavyohanyuma (fl. 2007–2015), Burundian politician
- Pie Traynor (1898–1972), American professional baseball player, manager, scout and radio broadcaster

== Places ==
- Pie Corner, a community in the parish of Saint Lucy, Barbados
- Pie Creek, a rural locality in the Gympie Region, Queensland, Australia
- Pie Island, an island in Lake Superior, Ontario, Canada
- Pie, West Virginia, an unincorporated community in the United States

== Arts, entertainment and media ==
=== Music ===
- "Pie" (song), by Future, 2017
- "The Pie", a 1972 song by Sutherland Brothers & Quiver

=== Television ===
- "Pie" (Entourage), an episode of the TV series Entourage
- "Pie" (Reacher), a 2022 Reacher episode
- PIE (TV channel), a Philippine free-to-air television channel
- "The Pie" (Seinfeld), a 1994 Seinfeld episode
- "The Pie", a 2011 Bananas in Pyjamas episode

=== Fictional characters ===
- Pie family, in the My Little Pony: Friendship Is Magic animated television series
- Pie, a character from the fourth season of Battle for Dream Island, an animated web series
- Pie, a character in the manga series Pie (Tokyo Mew Mew)
- "The Pie", a piebald horse in the book and film National Velvet

== Computing ==
- Android Pie, version 9 of Android mobile operating system
- Parity Inner Error, a type of error on a DVD, see DVD § Disc quality measurements
- Pie menu, a circular context menu
- Pocket Internet Explorer, a browser for Windows CE
- Position-independent executable, code that can execute anywhere in memory

== Science and technology ==
- Pied Pierrot or Pie, a butterfly genus
- Post Irradiation Examination, of spent nuclear fuel
- U1A polyadenylation inhibition element (PIE), an RNA element

== Organizations ==
- Collingwood Football Club, Australia, nicknamed "The Pies"
- Juventud Uruguaya de Pie, a former far-right youth organization
- Pacific International Enterprises, a film production company and distributor
- Paedophile Information Exchange, a UK 1974–1984 pro-paedophilia group
- Pioneers in Engineering, a student-run organization based at the University of California, Berkeley

== Other uses ==
- ISO 639:pie, the language code for the Piro Pueblo language
- Pan Island Expressway, Singapore
- Pie (loa), a type of spirit in Vodun/Voodoo religion
- Pie Magazine, a Canadian luxury lifestyle magazine
- PIE method (Problem, Intervention, Evaluation), a method of documentation in nursing
- Pie (monetary subunit), a former Indian unit of currency
- PIE, IATA airport code and FAA location identifier for St. Pete–Clearwater International Airport, Florida
- Pie, in Spanish customary units a unit of length
- PIE, a mnemonic for author's purpose: to persuade, inform, or entertain
- Prevention of Illegal Eviction from and Unlawful Occupation of Land Act, 1998, a South African law
- Principle of inclusion and exclusion, a counting technique in mathematics
- Proximity Immediacy Expectancy, principles for treating combat stress reaction

== See also ==
- Pi (disambiguation)
- Pieing, the act of throwing a pie at someone
- Pye (disambiguation)
