= Tuxentius hesperis =

Scientific classification
- Kingdom: Animalia
- Phylum: Arthropoda
- Clade: Pancrustacea
- Class: Insecta
- Order: Lepidoptera
- Family: Lycaenidae
- Genus: Tuxentius
- Species: T. hesperis

Binomial name
- Tuxentius hesperis (Vári, 1976)

Synonyms
- Castalius hesperis Vári, 1976

Species of butterfly

Tuxentius hesperis, the western pie, is a butterfly of the family Lycaenidae. It is found in South Africa, where it is only known from Groblershoop and Vioolsdrif and along the banks of the Orange River in the Northern Cape.

The wingspan is 18–22 mm for males and 20–23 mm for females. Adults are on wing year-round, but are most common from October to December.

The larvae feed on Ziziphus mucronata.
