= Pye-Smith =

Pye-Smith is a surname that may refer to:

- John Pye-Smith (1774–1851), English theologian
- Philip Pye-Smith (1839–1914), English physician and educator

== See also ==
- Pye (surname)
- Smith (surname)
