= Robert Eaglestone =

British literary critic and theorist

- Born: Robert Alexander Aldhelm Eaglestone; 1968 (age 57–58)
- Occupations: Professor of Contemporary Literature and Thought
- Known for: Literary theory, contemporary fiction, ethics
- Spouse: Poppy Corbett
- Awards: National Teaching Fellowship (2014)

Academic background
- Education: University of Manchester (BA); University of Southampton (MA); University of Wales, Lampeter (PhD)
- Thesis: Emmanuel Lévinas and the ethics of criticism (1995)

Academic work
- Institutions: Royal Holloway, University of London
- Notable works: Doing English: A Guide for Literature Students, The Holocaust and the Postmodern
- Website: pure.royalholloway.ac.uk/portal/en/persons/robert-eaglestone(fb218d7c-da01-4aa8-84e0-09b5c5aec566).html

Robert Eaglestone (born 1968) is a British literary critic and theorist. He is Professor of Contemporary Literature and Thought in the Department of English at Royal Holloway, University of London. He works on contemporary literature, literary theory and contemporary European philosophy, and on Holocaust and genocide studies. He edits the Routledge Critical Thinkers series.

In 2014, Eaglestone was the recipient of a National Teaching Fellowship, among the highest awards for pedagogy at university level in the United Kingdom. He was elected a fellow of the English Association in 2017. Eaglestone also serves as a media commentator and reviewer.

== Education ==
Eaglestone was educated at the University of Manchester where he was awarded a Bachelor of Arts degree and the University of Southampton where he was awarded a Master of Arts degree. He was awarded a PhD by the University of Wales, Lampeter in 1995 for research on Emmanuel Levinas.

== Career and research ==
Eaglestone has published books on fiction and the relationship between literature, ethics and history, Ethical Criticism: Reading After Levinas (1997), The Holocaust and the Postmodern (2004), The Broken Voice: Reading Post-Holocaust Literature (2017) and articles on Martin Heidegger, Emmanuel Levinas, Hannah Arendt and Jacques Derrida. He has also edited books on Salman Rushdie, J. M. Coetzee and on contemporary literature.

Eaglestone is also the author of a textbook, Doing English: a Guide for Literature Students (4th ed 2017) (US edition: Studying Literature). He has written about textbooks for AdvanceHE.

Eaglestone edited a book on Brexit, Brexit and Literature: Critical and Cultural Responses (2018), stating that Brexit is "a political, economic and administrative event: and it is a cultural one, too". He coined the term 'cruel nostalgia' in this context.

Eaglestone is concerned with the condition of literature studies: on this, he published Literature: Why it matters (2019) and a co-edited collection with Gail Marshall English: Shared Futures (2018).

Eaglestone is a commentator in the national press on the study on literature at school and in Higher Education. In English and its teachers: a history of Policy, Pedagogy and Practice, Simon Gibbons writes that "Eaglestone was not simply an ivory-towered academic seeking to shore up his own position - he had consistently demonstrated his commitment to effective teaching in secondary schools".

== Personal life ==
Eaglestone is married to Poppy Corbett and lives in Streatham, London. He has two children from his first marriage.

=== Published books ===
His publications include:

- Literature: Why It Matters (Cambridge: Polity, 2019)
- The Broken Voice: Reading Post-Holocaust Literature (Oxford: Oxford University Press, 2017)
- Contemporary Fiction: A Very Short Introduction (Oxford: Oxford University Press, 2013)
- Doing English: A Guide for Literature Students – fourth revised edition (London: Routledge, 2017) Japanese translation 2003. Arabic translation 2013.
- The Holocaust and the Postmodern
- Postmodernism and Holocaust Denial (Cambridge: Icon Books, 2001). Slovak translation, 2001; Turkish Translation, 2002; Japanese Translation 2004; Greek translation 2013.
- Doing English: A Guide for Literature Students (London: Routledge, 1999).
- Ethical Criticism: Reading After Levinas (Edinburgh: Edinburgh University Press, 1997).

=== As editor and co-editor ===
- with Dan O'Gorman The Routledge Companion to Twenty First Century Literary Fiction (London: Routledge, 2019).
- with Gail Marshall English: Shared Futures (English Association Essays and Studies, Boydell and Brewer, 2018).
- Brexit and Literature: Critical and Cultural Responses (London: Routledge, 2018).
- with Gert Buelens and Sam Durrant The Future of Trauma Theory: Contemporary Literary and Cultural Criticism (London: Routledge, 2013).
- with Martin MacQuillan, Salman Rushdie: Bloomsbury Contemporary Critical Perspectives (London: Bloomsbury, 2013).
- Blackwell Encyclopaedia of Literary and Cultural Theory Volume 2 (1966 to Present day) (Oxford: Blackwell, 2010).
- with Elleke Boehmer and Katy Iddiols J.M. Coetzee in Context and Theory (London: Continuum, 2009).
- with Simon Glendinning, Derrida's Legacies: Literature and Philosophy (London: Routledge, 2008).
- with Barry Langford Teaching Holocaust Literature and Film (London: Palgrave, 2008).
- Reading The Lord of the Rings (London: Continuum, 2005).
