= Pi (disambiguation) =

Pi (π) is a mathematical constant equal to a circle's circumference divided by its diameter.

Pi, π or Π may also refer to:

== Language and typography ==
- Pi (letter), the 17th letter of the Greek alphabet
- Pi characters, uncommon characters in typesetting
- Pi font, a term for some kinds of dingbat fonts
- Pali, an Indo-Aryan language (ISO 639-1 code: pi)
- Pi (kana), in syllabic Japanese script

== Places ==
- Pi (state), an ancient state during China's Zhou dynasty
- Pi, Catalonia, a village of Bellver de Cerdanya, Spain
- Pi County, Sichuan province, China
- Pi Islands, Palmer Archipelago, Antarctica
- Poris railway station, a railway station in Tangerang, Indonesia (station code PI)

== People ==
=== Given name ===
- Pi de Bruijn (born 1942), Dutch architect
- Pi O or П. O. (born 1951), Greek-Australian anarchist poet
- Pi Schwert (1892–1941), American baseball player and politician
- Pi Vèriss, Dutch songwriter and composer

=== Stage name ===
- Pi (entertainer), American drag performer

=== Surname ===
- Bi (surname) (Chinese: 毕), romanized as Pi in Wade–Giles
- Pi (surname) (Chinese: 皮), a Chinese surname
- Enric Pi (born 1983), Catalan footballer
- Francesc Pi i Margall (1824–1901), Catalan politician
- Jordi Sabater Pi (1922–2009), Catalan primatologist and ethologist
- Meritxell Mateu i Pi (born 1966), Andorran diplomat
- Ot Pi (born 1970), Catalan mountain bike trials rider
- Pedro Pi (1899–1970), Spanish sailor
- Renzo Pi Hugarte (1934–2012), Uruguayan anthropologist

== Arts, entertainment, and media ==
=== Fictional characters ===
- Pi (.hack), in the multimedia franchise .hack//G.U.
- Pi, in both:
  - Life of Pi, a 2001 novel, and
  - Life of Pi (film), a 2012 adaptation
- Pi, a member of Team Robo in Sega Soccer Slam
- Pi, in the 2006 animated film Shark Bait and the 2012 sequel The Reef 2: High Tide

=== Music ===
- Pi (instrument), several traditional Thai reed instruments
- "π", a song by Kate Bush from Aerial
- "Pi", a song by Hard 'n Phirm from Horses and Grasses
- "Pi", a song by J. Cole from Might Delete Later
- "Pi", a song by Käptn Peng & Die Tentakel von Delphi from Das nullte Kapitel
- Pi Recordings, a record label

=== Other arts, entertainment, and media ===
- Pi (film), a 1998 film directed by Darren Aronofsky
- P.I. (TV series), a 2017 Singaporean 1series
- Pi magazine, a student publication of the University College London Union

== Science and mathematics ==
=== Chemistry and biochemistry ===
- π, a measure of nucleotide diversity
- Π or Osmotic pressure
- P_{i}, an inorganic phosphate group
- Isoelectric point (pI), the pH at which a particular molecule carries no net electrical charge in the statistical mean
- Pi bond, a chemical bond

=== Logic and computer science ===
- Π, the symbol for maxterm notation in Karnaugh mapping
- Raspberry Pi, a single-board computer developed by Raspberry Pi Foundation; also known as Pi

=== Mathematics ===
- Π, a glyph representing the product of a sequence of terms
- Π^{0}_{n}, a set in the arithmetical hierarchy
- Π^{1}_{n}, a set in the analytical hierarchy
- Π^{P}_{i}, a set in the polynomial hierarchy
- Π(x) (Pi function), the Gamma function when offset to coincide with the factorial
- Π(n, k), the complete elliptic integral of the third kind
- π_{n}(X), the nth homotopy group of X
- Π_{n}(X), the fundamental n-groupoid of X
  - Π(X), the fundamental groupoid of X
- π^{n}(X), the nth cohomotopy set of X
- π_{n}, a notation for the scalar projection onto the n-th component
- π-calculus, a process calculus
- Prime-counting function or π(x)
- $\pi$, the population proportion in statistics

=== Physics ===
- Pion or π, a subatomic particle
- π_{i}, a dimensionless quantity as derived from the Buckingham π theorem.

== Other uses ==
- Pi (AI agent), AI coding agent through the terminal
- Pi (prefix symbol), or pebi, in computing
- Π, for plaintiff, in legal shorthand
- Π, stands for Pierikos kit logo
- Pi Day, March 14 (3/14 in the US)
- Principal investigator, a lead researcher
- Private investigator

== See also ==
- PI (disambiguation)
- P (disambiguation)
- Pai (disambiguation)
- Pie (disambiguation)
- Pye (disambiguation)
