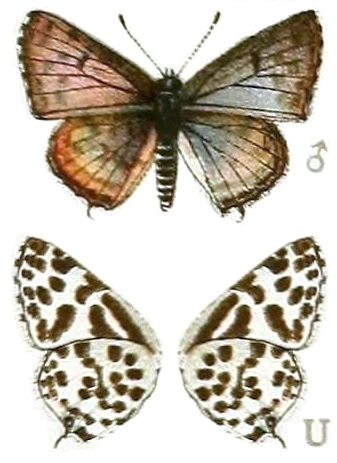

Scientific classification
- Kingdom: Animalia
- Phylum: Arthropoda
- Clade: Pancrustacea
- Class: Insecta
- Order: Lepidoptera
- Family: Lycaenidae
- Subfamily: Polyommatinae
- Tribe: Polyommatini
- Genus: Zintha; Eliot, 1973
- Species: Z. hintza

Binomial name
- Zintha hintza (Trimen, 1864)

Synonyms
- Castalius hintza (Trimen, 1864); Lycaena hintza Trimen, 1864; Castalius hintza krooni Dickson, 1973; Castalius resplendens Butler, 1876

= Zintha =

Blue-eyed Pierrot

Monotypic butterfly genus in family Lycaenidae

Zintha is a butterfly genus in the family Lycaenidae. It is monotypic, with the only species being Zintha hintza, the blue-eyed Pierrot, blue pied Pierrot or Hintza blue. The pied Pierrots proper are the closely related genus Tuxentius, however, and like Zintha they were formerly included in Castalius.

== Description ==
The wingspan is 24–28 mm for males and 24–27 mm for females. Adults are on wing from September to April.

== Food plants ==
The larvae feed on Ziziphus species, including Z. zeyheriana and Z. mucronata.

== Distribution and subspecies ==
This butterfly occurs in tropical eastern and southern Africa. Three subspecies are recognized:

- Zintha hintza hintza (Trimen, 1864) – South Africa to Kenya, possibly Zaire
- Zintha hintza krooni (Dickson, 1973) – Namibia and adjacent regions
- Zintha hintza resplendens (Butler, 1876) – Ethiopia and adjacent regions

== Gallery ==
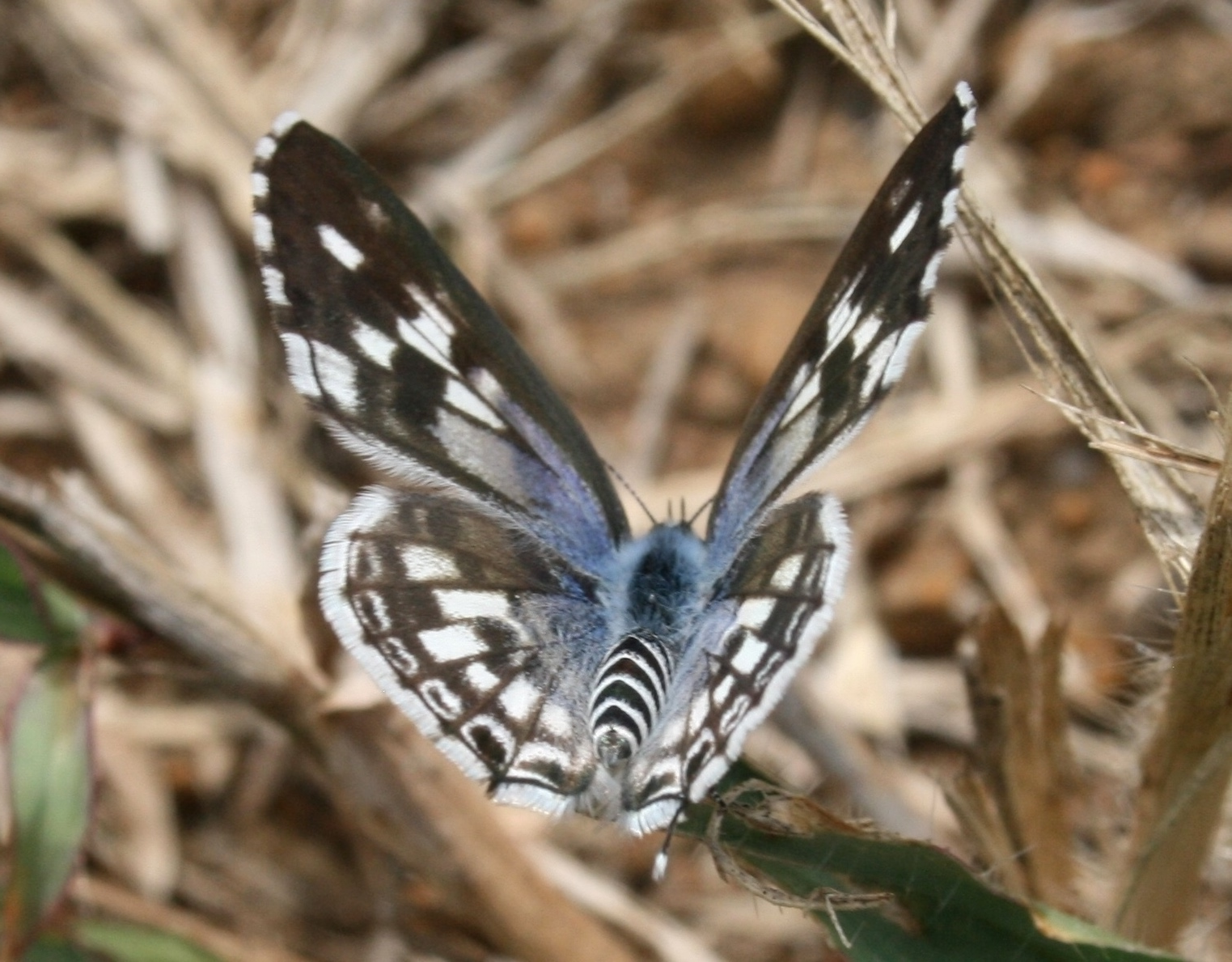
Female imago

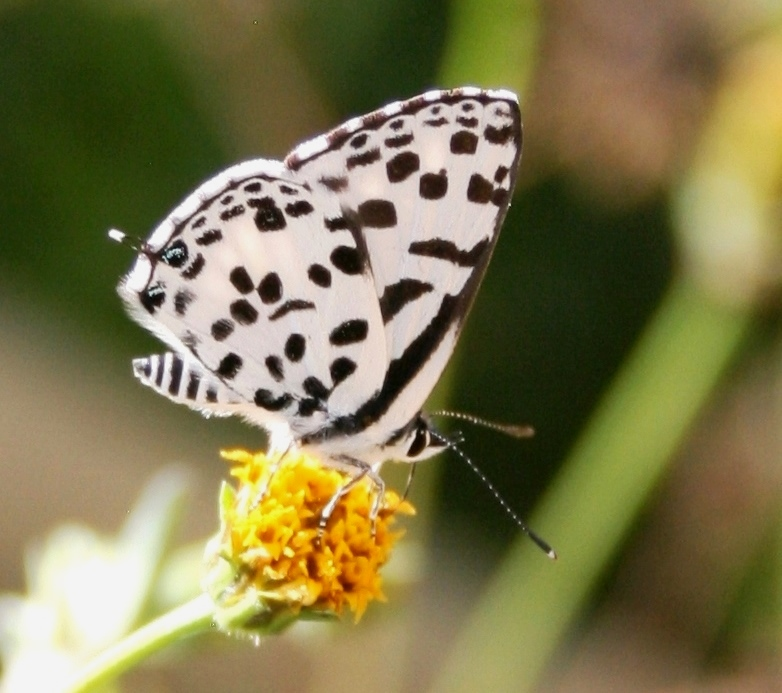
Wing undersides

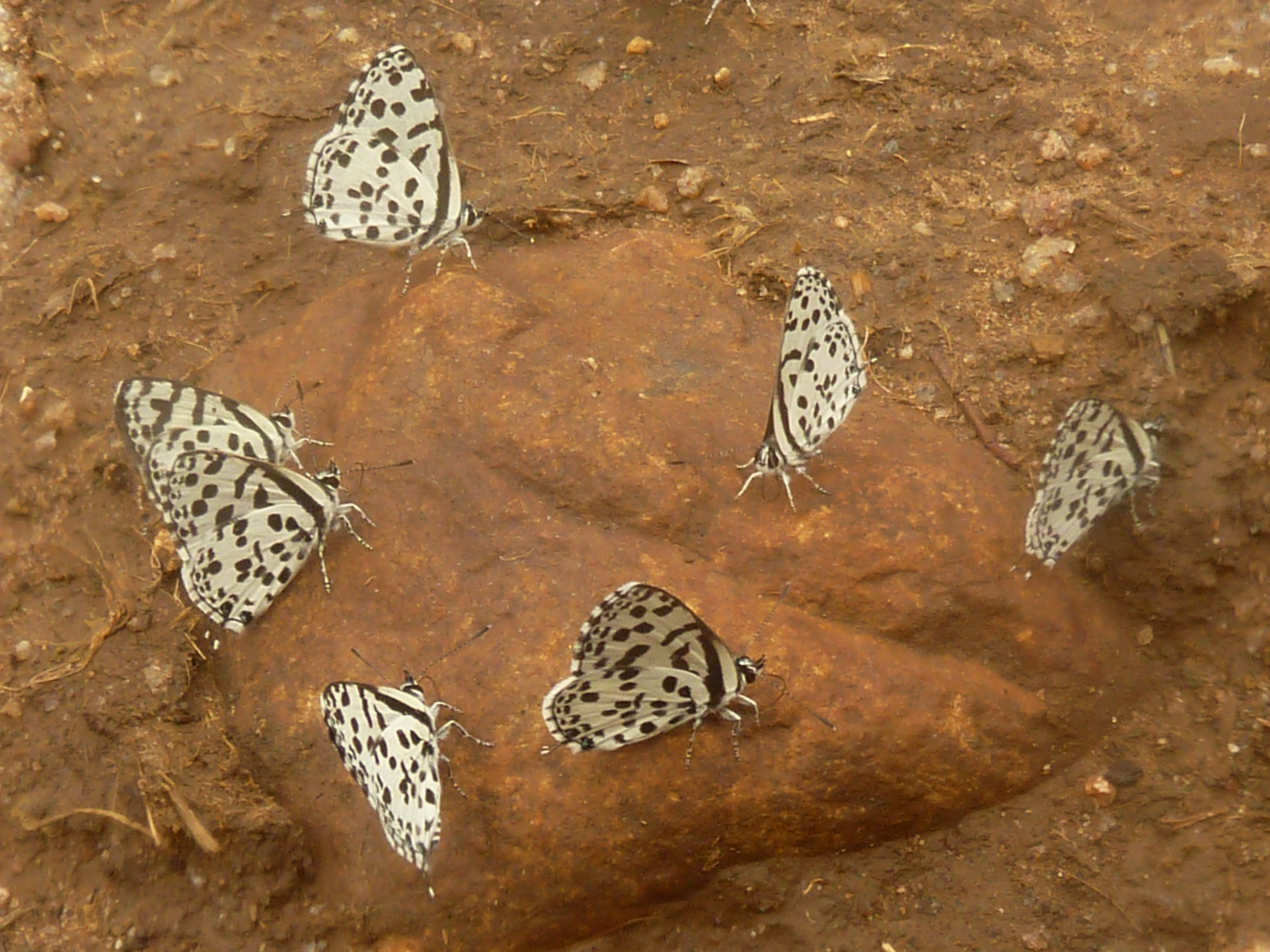
A group mud-puddling
