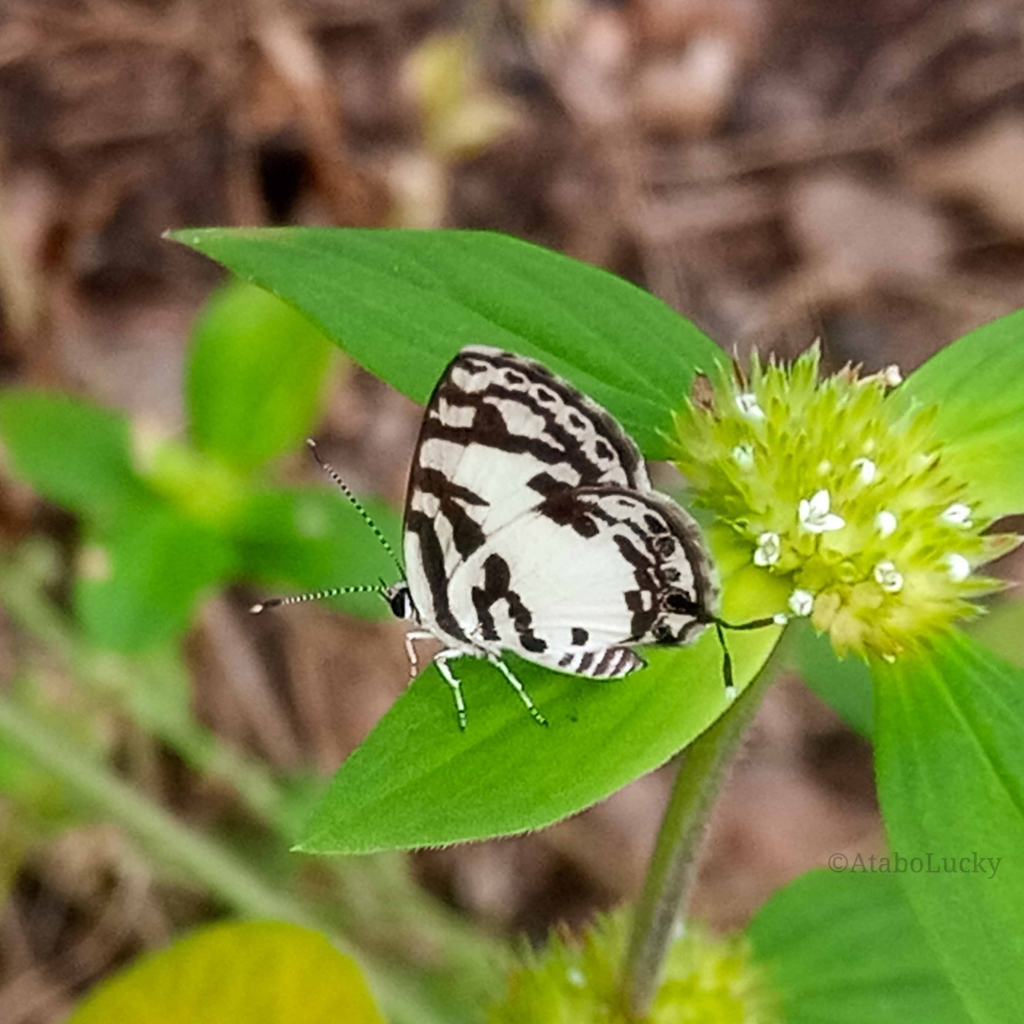

Scientific classification
- Kingdom: Animalia
- Phylum: Arthropoda
- Clade: Pancrustacea
- Class: Insecta
- Order: Lepidoptera
- Family: Lycaenidae
- Genus: Tuxentius
- Species: T. cretosus

Binomial name
- Tuxentius cretosus (Butler, 1876)

Synonyms
- Castalius cretosus Butler, 1876; Castalius lactinatus Butler, 1886; Lycaena nodieri Oberthür, 1883; Castalius anomalogramma Bethune-Baker, 1911; Castalius usemia Neave, 1904

= Tuxentius cretosus =

Species of butterfly

Tuxentius cretosus, the savanna pied Pierrot, is a butterfly in the family Lycaenidae. It is found in Senegal, the Gambia, Burkina Faso, Ghana, Mali, Nigeria, Cameroon, Ethiopia, Somalia, Uganda and Kenya. The habitat consists of dry savanna and Guinea savanna.

It differs from Tuxentius calice gregorii (Butler, 1894) thus: Marginal band of the forewing above irregular with 1 to 4 distinctly prominent white spots. Submarginal line of the forewing beneath entirely coherent, not interrupted by the light veins.

The larval host plant also serves as the nectar source for the adults. Adult males mud-puddle.

The larvae feed on Ziziphus jujuba.

== Subspecies ==
- Tuxentius cretosus cretosus (Ethiopia, coast of Kenya)
- Tuxentius cretosus lactinatus (Butler, 1886) (Somalia)
- Tuxentius cretosus nodieri (Oberthür, 1883) (Senegal, the Gambia, Burkina Faso, northern Ghana, Mali, northern Nigeria, northern Cameroon)
- Tuxentius cretosus usemia (Neave, 1904) (Uganda, northern and western Kenya)

Torben Larsen developed a species numbering system for his 2005 publication Butterflies of West Africa. The subspecies nodieri is #583. The 'Larsen' numbers have since been used with permission in A Sharp Eye on Butterflies of Ghana.
