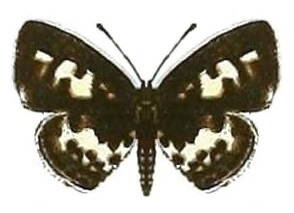

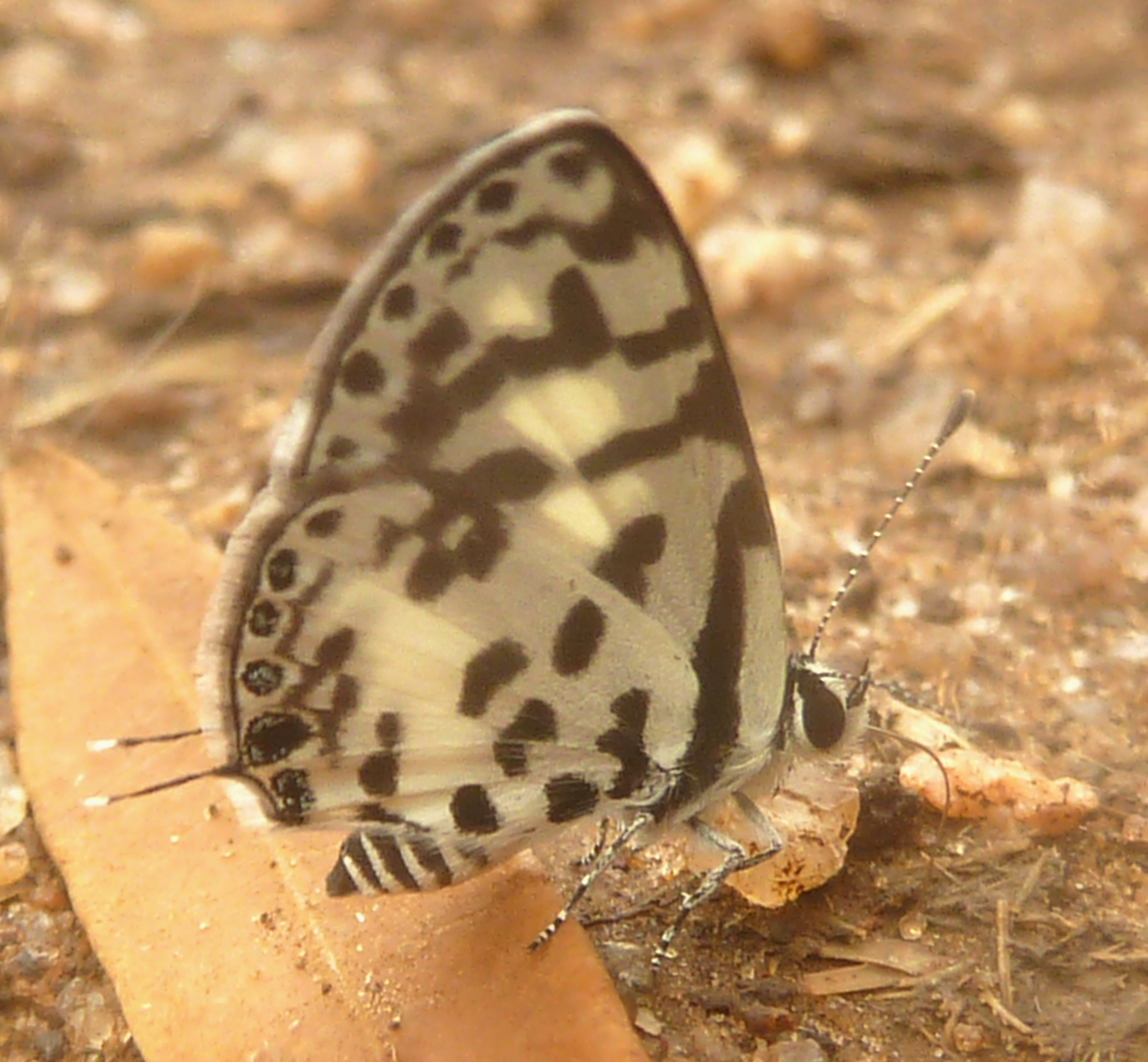
- Upper and underside of the nominate subspecies

Scientific classification
- Kingdom: Animalia
- Phylum: Arthropoda
- Class: Insecta
- Order: Lepidoptera
- Family: Lycaenidae
- Genus: Tuxentius
- Species: T. melaena

Binomial name
- Tuxentius melaena (Trimen, 1887)
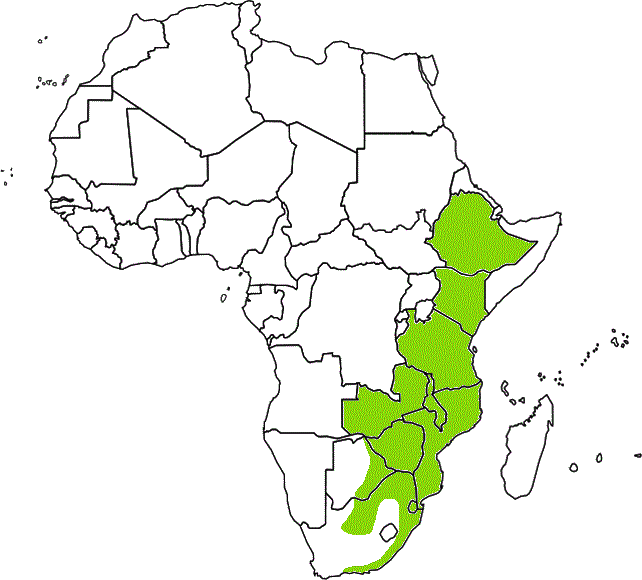
- approximate range

Synonyms
- Lycaena melaena Trimen, 1887; Castalius melaena; Lycaena griqua Trimen, 1887; Cupido melas Aurivillius, 1924

= Tuxentius melaena =

Black pie

Species of butterfly

Tuxentius melaena, the black pie or dark pied Pierrot, is a butterfly of the family Lycaenidae. It is found in Africa.

== Description ==
The wingspan is 19–24 mm for males and 21–25 mm for females. Adults are on wing year-round, but are most common from October to March.

Taxonomic status of the species remains uncertain due to significant variations noted across individual specimens.

== Appearance ==
Males of subspecies Tuxentius melaena griqua are characterised by having faint, dark markings on a dirty- yellow base color, on the dorsal region. There are minimal white markings on that side, which are distinctive but subtle. Whereas the female specimens contain reduced black markings on their ventral region. On the upperside of the hindwing, they feature expanded white markings. Individual variations are also detected within subspecies.

== Habitat and behavior ==
The larvae feed on Ziziphus mucronata and probably other Ziziphus species.

== Subspecies ==
- Tuxentius melaena melaena — South Africa (from Eastern Cape and KwaZulu-Natal coast, inland to Gauteng, Mpumalanga, Limpopo and North West) to Zimbabwe, Mozambique, Malawi, Zambia, Tanzania, Kenya, Ethiopia
- Tuxentius melaena griqua (Trimen, 1887) — Northern Cape, South Africa
