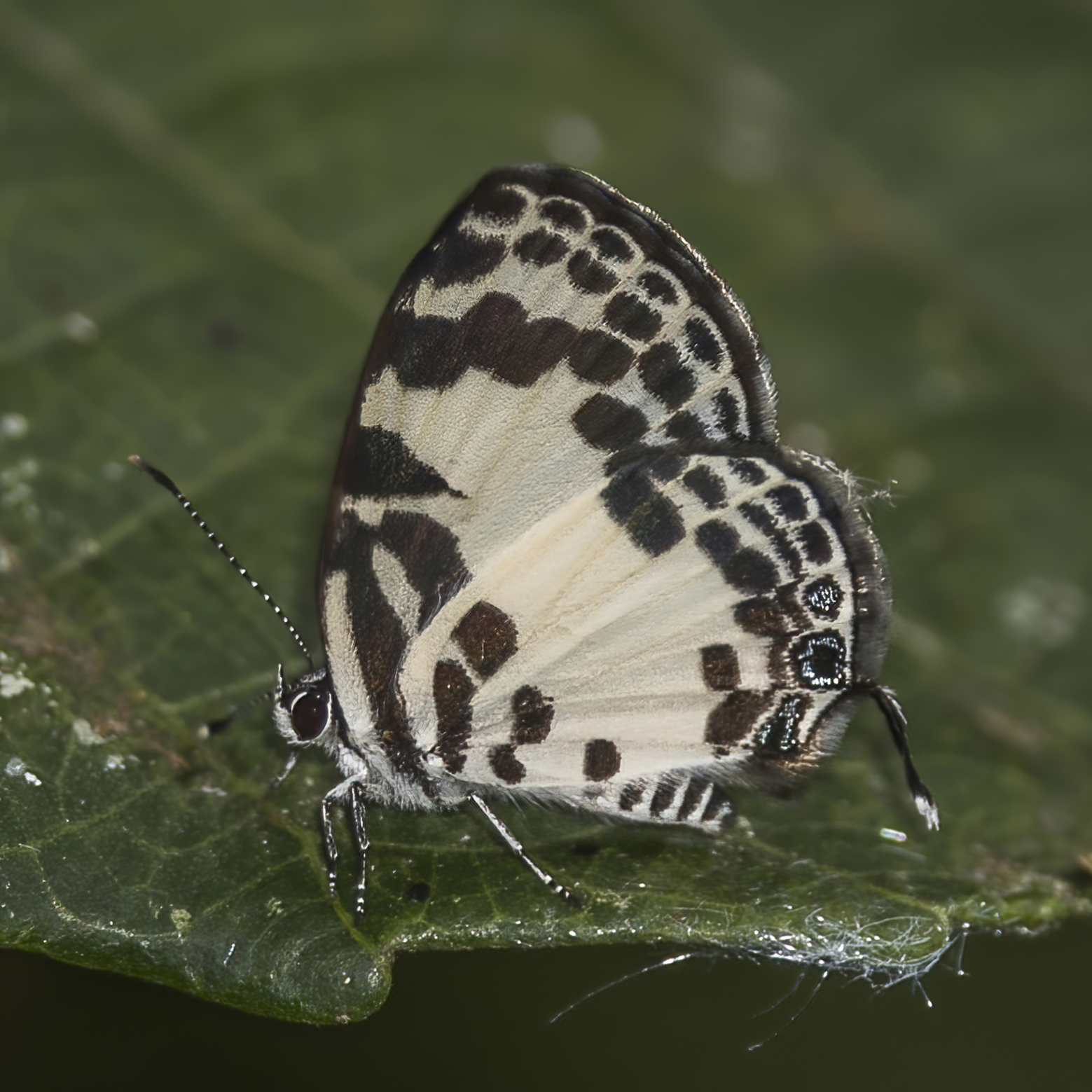
- female in Ghana

Scientific classification
- Kingdom: Animalia
- Phylum: Arthropoda
- Clade: Pancrustacea
- Class: Insecta
- Order: Lepidoptera
- Family: Lycaenidae
- Genus: Tuxentius
- Species: T. carana

Binomial name
- Tuxentius carana (Hewitson, 1876)

Synonyms
- Lycaena carana Hewitson, 1876; Cupido kontu Karsch, 1893

= Tuxentius carana =

Forest pied Pierrot

Species of butterfly

Tuxentius carana, the forest pied Pierrot, is a butterfly in the family Lycaenidae. It is found in Guinea, Sierra Leone, Liberia, Ivory Coast, Ghana, Togo, Nigeria, Cameroon, Gabon, the Republic of the Congo, Angola, the Central African Republic and the DRC. The habitat consists of forests.

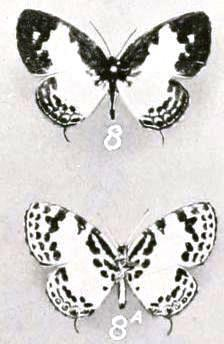
T. c. kontu

Adult males mud-puddle.

== Subspecies ==
- Tuxentius carana carana – Nigeria: Cross River loop, Cameroon, Gabon, Congo, northern Angola, Central African Republic, Democratic Republic of the Congo
- Tuxentius carana kontu (Karsch, 1893) – Guinea, Sierra Leone, Liberia, Ivory Coast, Ghana, Togo, western Nigeria

Torben Larsen developed a species numbering system for his 2005 publication Butterflies of West Africa. The subspecies kontu is #584. The 'Larsen' numbers have since been used with permission in A Sharp Eye on Butterflies of Ghana.
