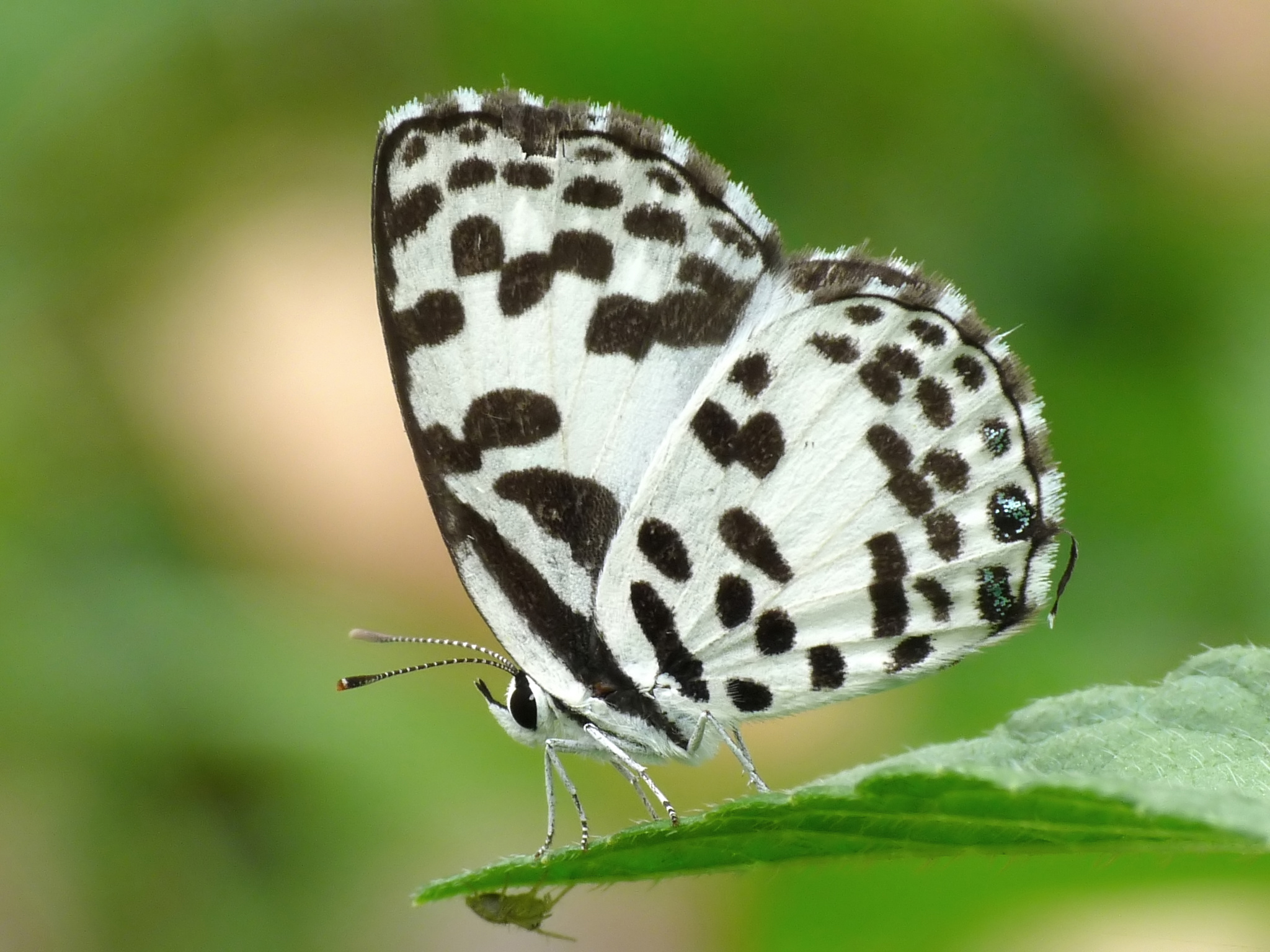

Scientific classification
- Kingdom: Animalia
- Phylum: Arthropoda
- Class: Insecta
- Order: Lepidoptera
- Family: Lycaenidae
- Genus: Castalius
- Species: C. rosimon

Binomial name
- Castalius rosimon (Fabricius, 1775)

Synonyms
- Papilio rosimon Fabricius, 1775

= Castalius rosimon =

Common Pierrot

Species of butterfly

Castalius rosimon, the common Pierrot, is a small butterfly found in India that belongs to the lycaenids, or blues family.

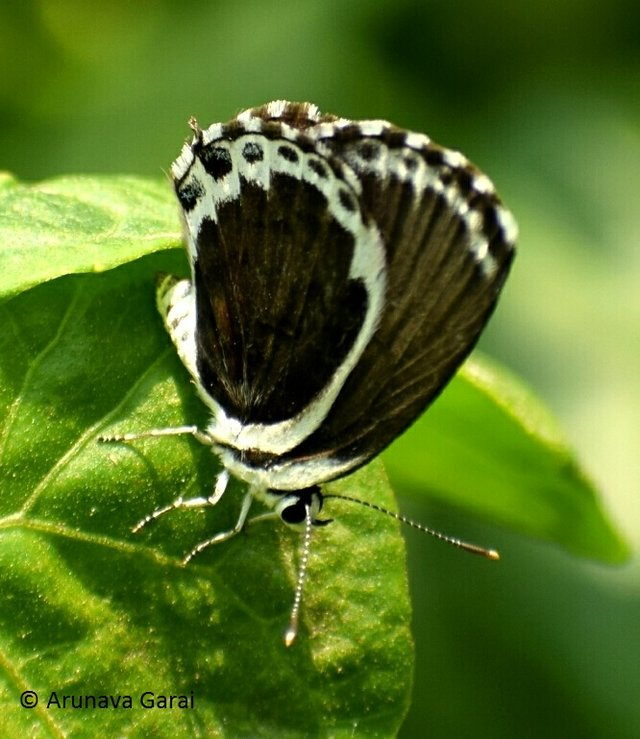
Genetically aberrant Common Pierrot, West Bengal (Chakrovorty et al., 2020) [6]

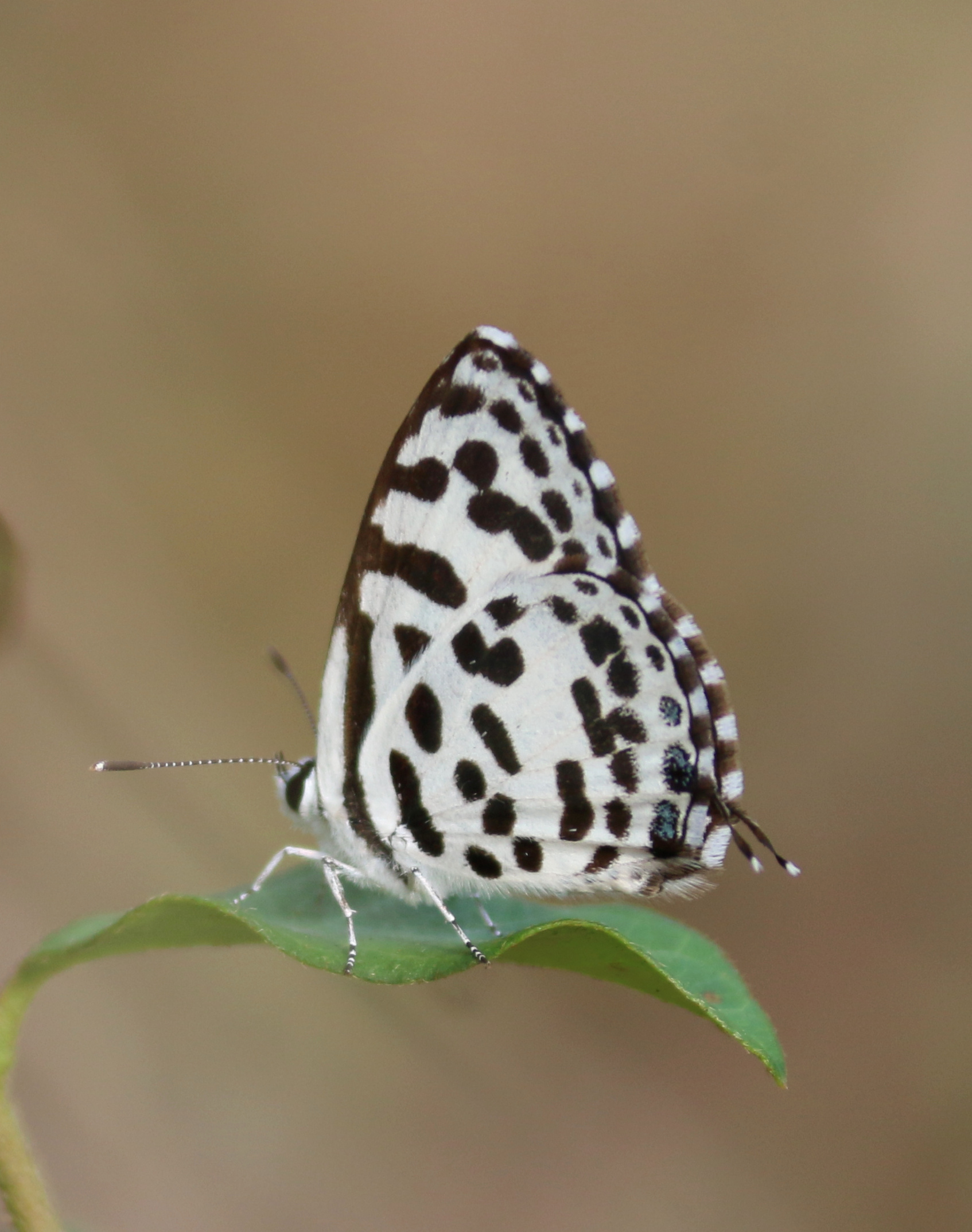
Castalius rosimon, common Pierrot

== Distribution ==
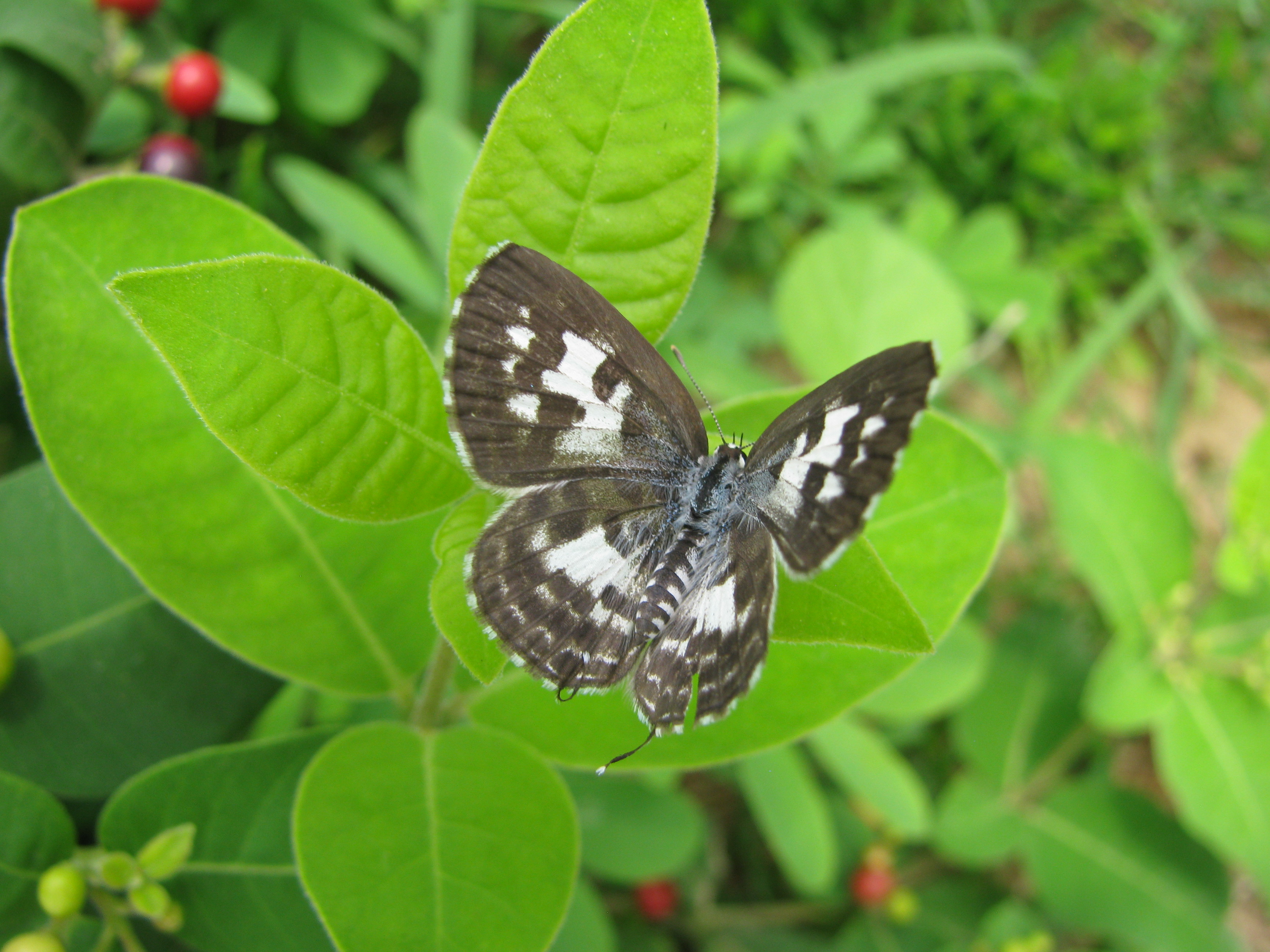
Open wing position of common Pierrot found in Shantiniketan, West Bengal, India

The species is found in Sri Lanka, Bangladesh, India, Myanmar; Tenasserim, extending into the Malayan subregion. In the Indonesian archipelago the butterfly occurs in north-eastern Sumatra, Kalimantan, eastern Java, Bali, Bangka, Timor, Wetar, Kissar, Sumbawa and Sulawesi.

In India the butterfly is found south of the outer ranges of the Himalayas, except in desert tracts; east India; the north-west Himalayas; Assam. The butterfly is also found in the Andaman Islands and the southern Nicobar Islands.

In South Moluccas occurs ssp. godarti Fruhstorfer, 1918 and in the Philippines occurs monrosi Semper, 1887

== Description ==
=== Male ===
The upperside of its wings is mainly white. Forewing has the costa, apex and termen edged with black, the edging much broader on apex and termen; base outwards for a short distance more or less densely overlaid. with metallic blue scales which cover and make indistinct a large basal outwardly clavate (club-shaped) black spot; a transverse black oval spot on the discocellulars touching the black edging on the costa; an oblique irregular line of four quadrate black spots beyond, the upper spot coalesced with the black on the costal border, the next spot below shifted outwards out of line, touching, as does also the lowest spot, the terminal black edging; posterior to this is a quadrate black spot in the apical half of interspace 2, and placed obliquely outwards from 1b coalescent with the terminal black border, another similar spot in interspace 1. Individuals of this species have been reported to exhibit seasonal colour variations and melanic aberrations that shows a similar pigmentation pattern.

Hindwing: three basal black somewhat coalescent spots overlaid with metallic blue scaling; the costal margin above the subcostal vein and vein 7 black; this colour filling also the base of interspace 6, where in some specimens it is divided into a basal portion with a spot beyond; a postdiscal curved transverse black band followed by a subterminal transverse series of black spots, each spot edged inwardly and outwardly by very slender lunules of the white ground colour; on the inner side of the postdiscal band posteriorly is a broken line of four black generally coalescent spots two and two, the two upper often touching the postdiscal band.

Underside primarily white. Forewing has a long oblique black band from base outwards to the costa; below it and obliquely placed an irregular black somewhat conical mark; following these are two outwardly oblique, medially interrupted, black macular bands; the inner of the two extended from costa along the discocellulars, is then widely interrupted below its posterior portion that is formed of two elongate coalescent spots and touches the inner subterminal transverse line of elongate spots just above the tornus; the outer, obliquely placed line is subapical and medially broken, the middle portion consisting of a quadrate spot is shifted outwards; finally, two parallel subterminal transverse series of black elongate spots, the inner series of broad, more or less rectangular spots, the outer series of more linear spots, the latter coalescent anteriorly with a slender anteciliary black line.

Hindwing: a transverse basal black band, with an elongate black spot below it on the dorsum; a transverse subbasal line of four well-separated black spots; a transverse, oval, discocellular black spot and obliquely above it three subcostal similar spots, the inner two coalescent; postdiscal and terminal markings consist, the former of four black posterior spots two and two, each pair coalescent and placed en echelon, the latter of a transverse double series of subterminal black spots and an anteciliary black line; the upper portion of the postdiscal markings touches the inner subterminal line. Cilia of both forewings and hindwings white alternated with black at the apices of the veins; filamentous short tail to the hindwing black tipped with white.

Antennae, head, thorax and abdomen black, the shafts of the antennae ringed with white, the head between the eyes and behind them white; beneath: the palpi, thorax and abdomen white, the last barred broadly with white on the sides.

=== Female ===
Similar to the male but with the black markings on the upper and undersides broader.

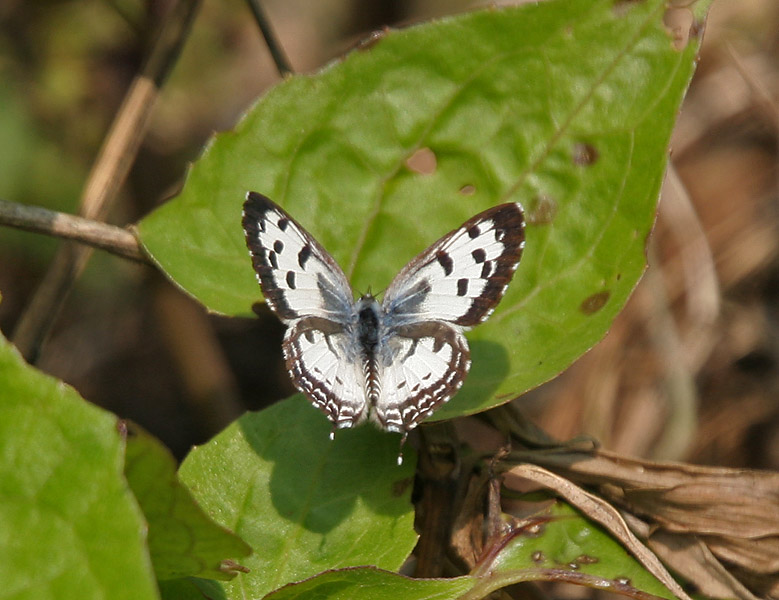
Male upperside, West Bengal, India

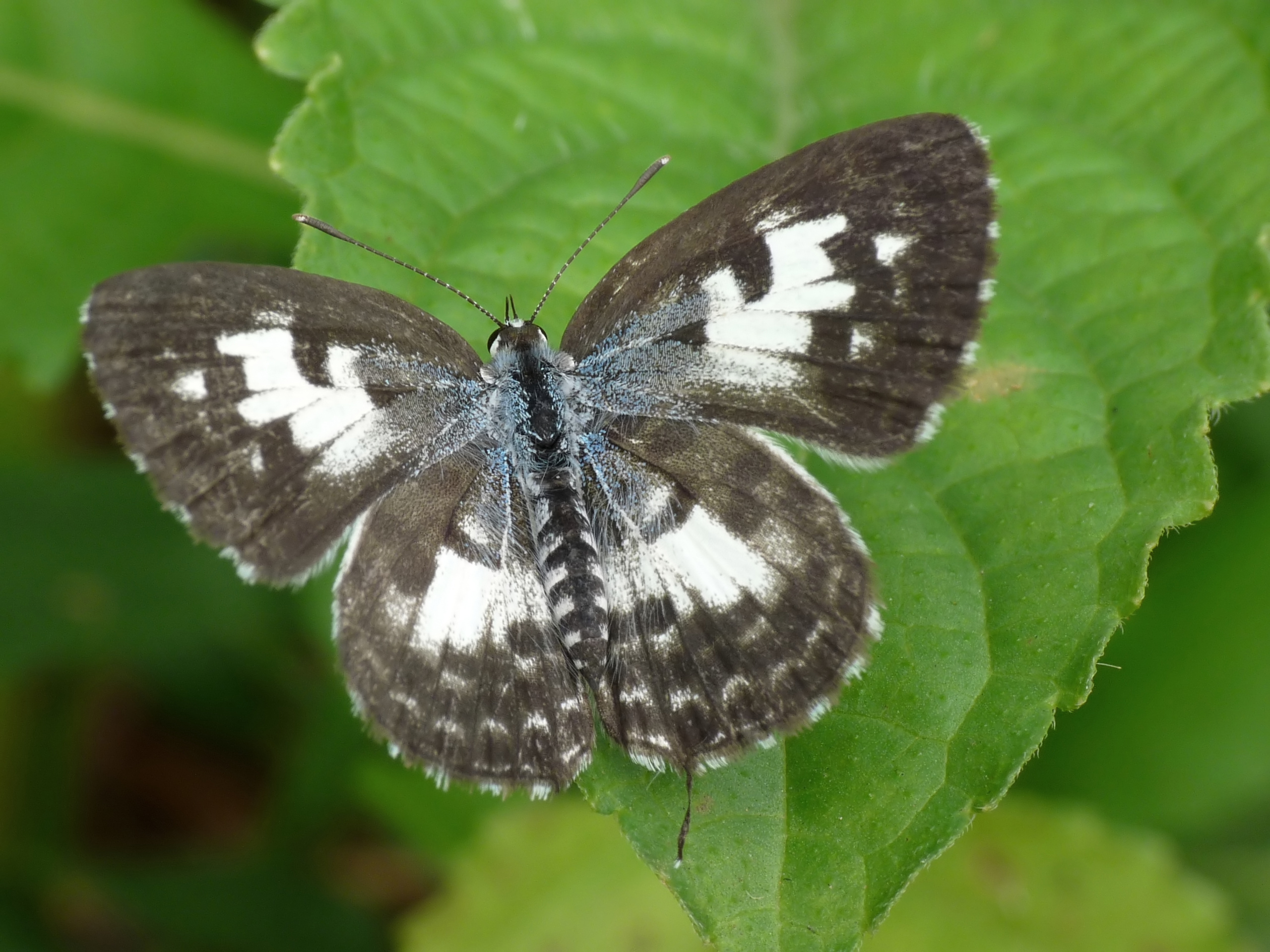
Female upperside, Kerala, India

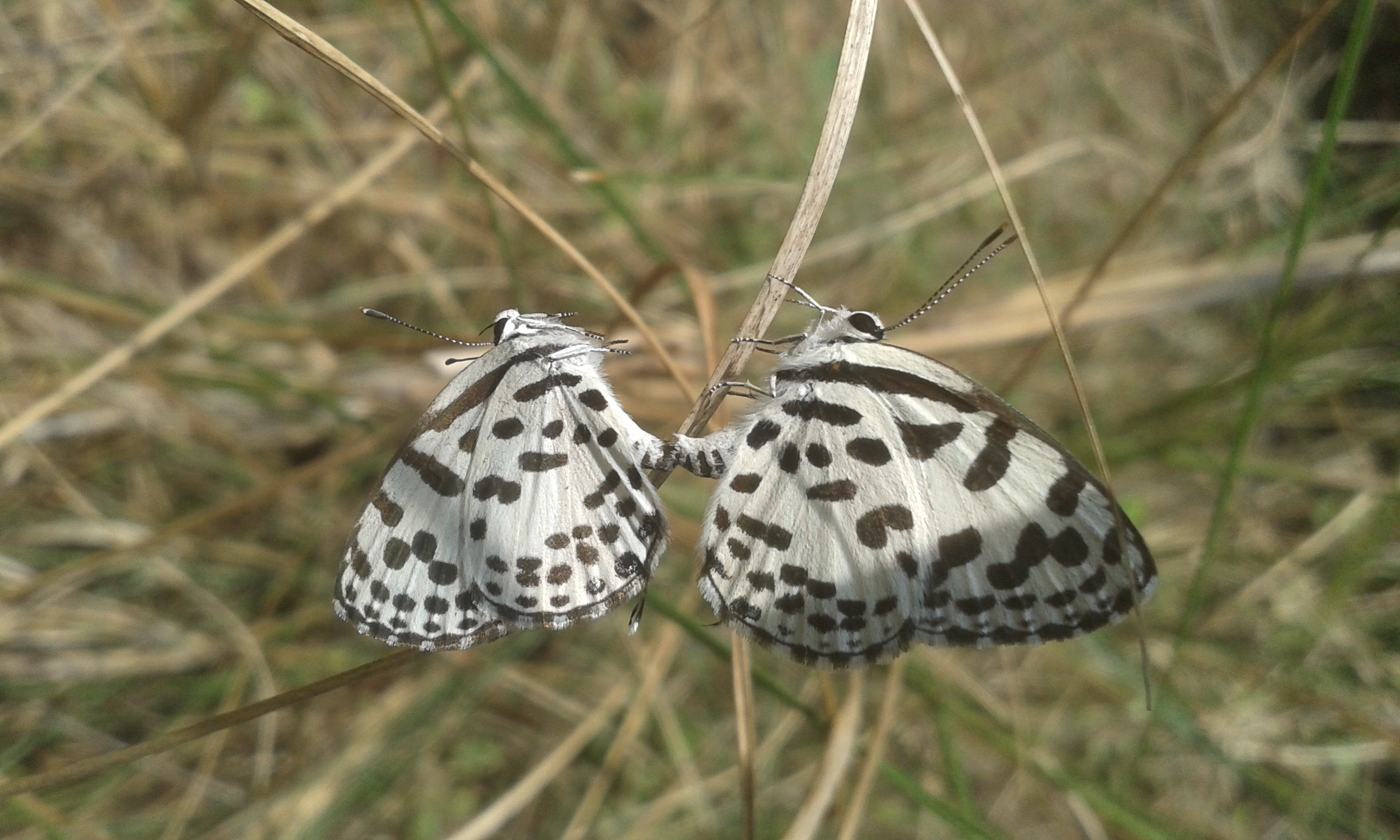
Mating pair at IIT Madras, Chennai

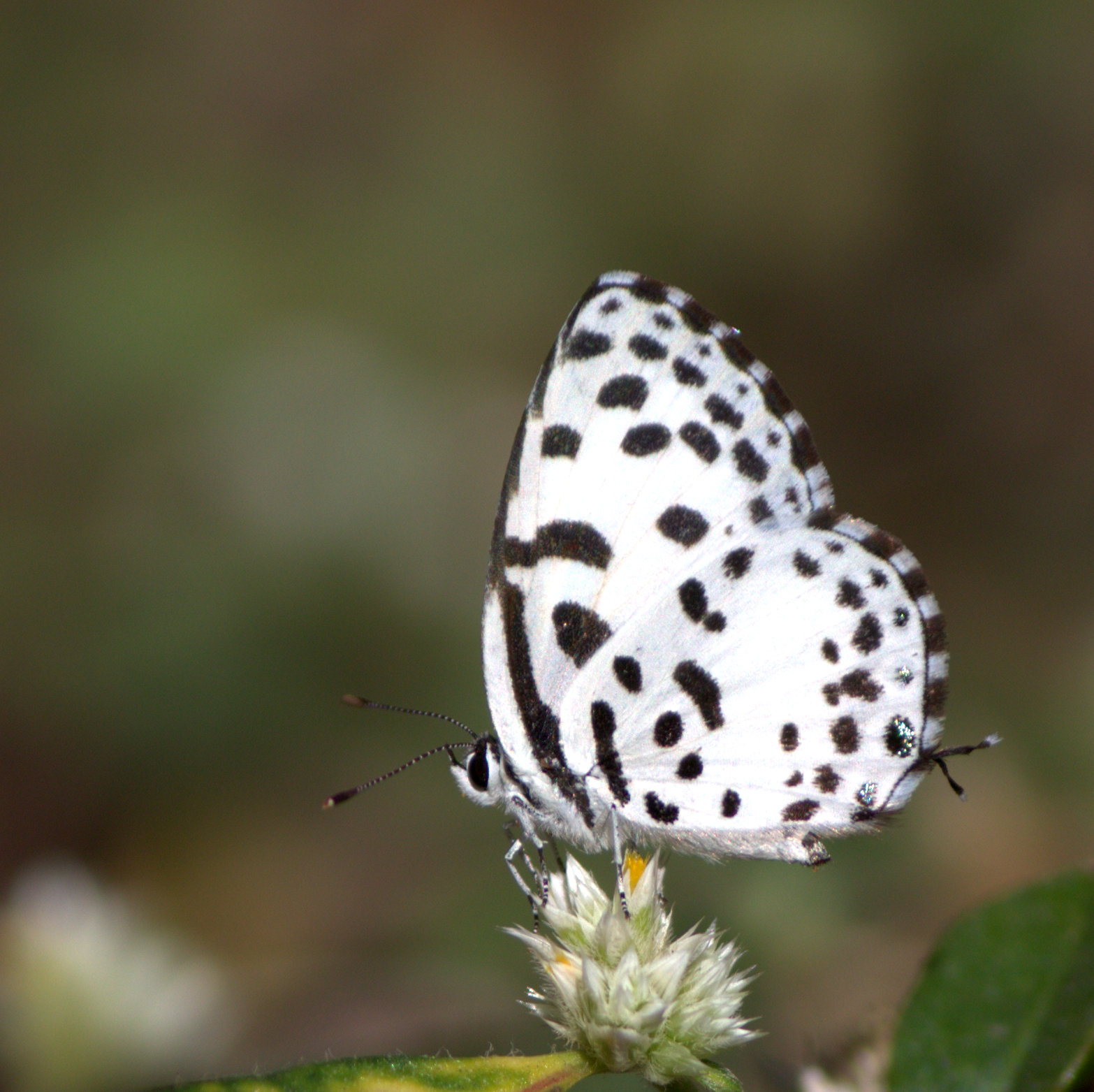
Dry season form from Bangalore, Karnataka, India

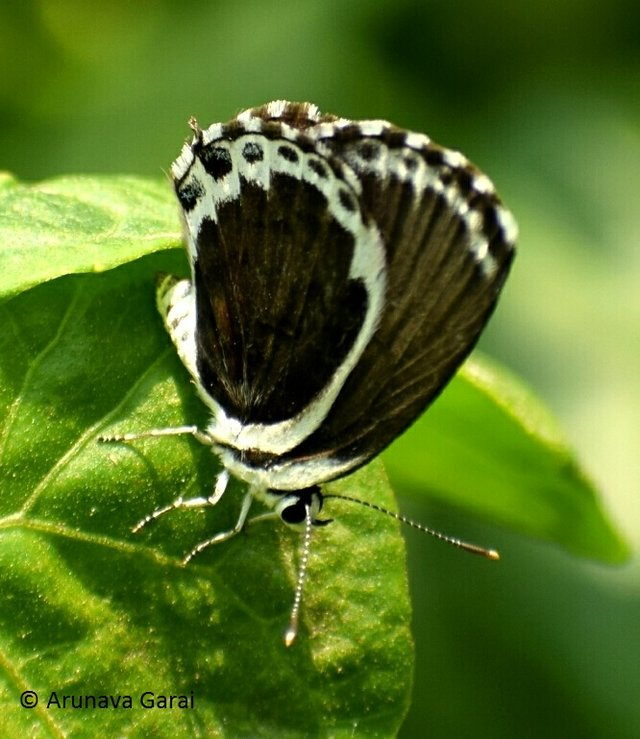
Genetically aberrant Common Pierrot, West Bengal [6]

=== Larva ===
"Feeds on Ziziphus jujuba and is of a rough texture as if shagreened all over. It is of the usual woodlouse form, much flattened towards the anal segment which is very broad; head concealed; colour bright green with a double, dorsal, yellow line and the sides powdered with small yellow spots." (Davidson, Bell and Aitken)

=== Pupa ===
"Of the usual Castalius form but narrow and slightly flattened. It is intensely glossy as if covered with gum. It varies in colour, being sometimes black, at others green with inconstant black markings." (Davidson, Bell & Aitken)

== See also ==
- List of butterflies of India
- List of butterflies of India (Lycaenidae)
