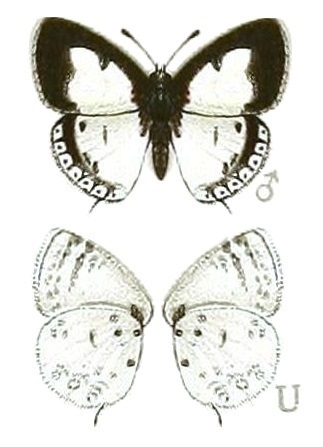

Scientific classification
- Kingdom: Animalia
- Phylum: Arthropoda
- Clade: Pancrustacea
- Class: Insecta
- Order: Lepidoptera
- Family: Lycaenidae
- Genus: Tuxentius
- Species: T. margaritaceus

Binomial name
- Tuxentius margaritaceus (Sharpe, 1892)

Synonyms
- Castalius margaritaceus Sharpe, 1892; Castalius margaritaceus f. phasma Talbot, 1935

= Tuxentius margaritaceus =

Mountain pied Pierrot

Species of butterfly

Tuxentius margaritaceus, the Margarita's Pierrot or mountain pied Pierrot, is a butterfly in the family Lycaenidae.

== Range and habitat ==
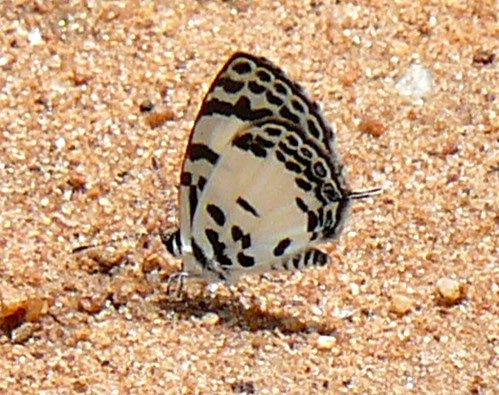
At Murchison Falls N. P., Uganda

It is found in Nigeria, Cameroon, the highlands of Angola, the DRC (Uele, Ituri, Kivu, Maniema and Sankuru), southern Sudan, Uganda, central and western Kenya and northern Tanzania. The habitat consists of sub-montane forests and moist savanna, especially along river courses in mountainous regions.

== Habits and food plant ==
Adult males mud-puddle. The larvae feed on Gouania longispicata.
