= Poppy Corbett =

Poppy Corbett FHEA
- Born: 18 August 1986 (age 40)
- Citizenship: British
- Education: English & Drama (BA), Royal Holloway, Advanced Theatre Practice (MFA), Royal Central School of Speech & Drama
- Occupations: Playwright, educator
- Relatives: Pie Corbett (father)
- Writing career
- Genres: Comedy, farce, historical
- Notable awards: Bruntwood Prize (2022; longlist), Victoria Wood Playwriting Prize for Comedy (2024; shortlist)
- Website: https://www.cssd.ac.uk/staff-profiles/dr-poppy-corbett

Poppy Corbett (born 18 August 1986) is a playwright, director and teacher of creative writing. She studied at Royal Holloway, University of London, the Royal Central School of Speech and Drama and the Royal Court Young Writers Programme. She is the daughter of the poet and educationalist Pie Corbett.

Corbett's play Hatchling won Masterclass' inaugural Pitch Your Play competition and was given a reading on the Theatre Royal Haymarket's main stage. She is the author of numerous short plays, including a pantomime Robin Hood for Bigfoot Arts Education.

She is the co-author of The Enormous Book of Talk for Writing Games, a creative writing resource book for teachers. She is co-founder of Agent 160, a nationwide playwriting collective whose patrons include writers Timberlake Wertenbaker, Sharon Morgan and Kaite O'Reilly.

In 2019, contributed to the University of Bristol's AHRC-funded Creative Histories of Witchcraft project, the first attempt to document criminal cases involving witchcraft in long nineteenth century France. A monograph under the same name was written by Corbett, poet Anna Kisbey Compton and historian Will Pooley and published by Cambridge University Press in 2022.

In 2020, Corbett was one of three playwrights on the Old Vic and Shoreditch Town Hall's 'Old Vic 12' where she wrote Fake Melania, a farce responding to conspiracy theories about the replacement of Melania Trump. It went on to be longlisted for the 2022 Bruntwood Prize and shortlisted for the inaugural 2024 Victoria Wood Playwriting Prize for Comedy.

In 2021, Corbett continued her work on creative histories and became attached to the AHRC's project The People of 1381 where she wrote a play about the 1381 Peasants' Revolt based on new research called Time Of The Rumour (originally called The Time of Rumours). It was developed with students at the University of Reading and received a rehearsed reading at the Essex Book Festival in 2023. An online game that "is the story of a woman caught up in the revolt" and based on the real life of peasant Margery Tawney was created to coincide with the writing of the play.

Since September 2024, Corbett has been a lecturer in Writing for Performance at the Royal Central School of Speech and Drama.

In 2026, she contributed to All the Rage, a site-specific theatre production written by more than 80 female or female-identifying playwrights in response to the release of the Epstein files, staged at Theatre Deli's Leadenhall Street space.
