= Pie (surname) =

Pie is a surname. Notable people with the surname include:

- Bruce Pie (1902–1961), Australian politician
- Christina Pie, American poker player
- Félix Pie (born 1985), Dominican baseball player
- Jonathan Pie, fictional character created and portrayed by English comedian Tom Walker.
- Louis-Édouard-François-Desiré Pie (1815–1880), French Catholic cardinal
- Ntot Ngijol Jean Pie (born 1986), Cameroonian footballer

== See also ==
- Pye (surname)
