= Primary National Strategy =

UK government education strategy

The Primary National Strategy document was launched in the UK in May 2003 by Charles Clarke, the Secretary of State for Education. The then-existing National Numeracy Strategy and National Literacy Strategy were taken under the umbrella of the Primary National Strategy.

In September 2006, the frameworks for teaching literacy and mathematics were "renewed" and issued in electronic form as the Primary Framework for literacy and mathematics.

== See also ==
- National Curriculum (England, Wales and Northern Ireland)
- The National Strategies
