= Tuxentius ertli =

Scientific classification
- Domain: Eukaryota
- Kingdom: Animalia
- Phylum: Arthropoda
- Class: Insecta
- Order: Lepidoptera
- Family: Lycaenidae
- Genus: Tuxentius
- Species: T. ertli

Binomial name
- Tuxentius ertli (Aurivillius, 1907)

Synonyms
- Cupido (Castalius) ertli Aurivillius, 1907

Species of butterfly

Tuxentius ertli, the Ertli's Pierrot, is a butterfly in the family Lycaenidae. It is found in Tanzania, Malawi and Zambia. The habitat consists of woodland at high elevations.

The larvae feed on Gouania longispicata.
