= Tuxentius kaffana =

Scientific classification
- Kingdom: Animalia
- Phylum: Arthropoda
- Class: Insecta
- Order: Lepidoptera
- Family: Lycaenidae
- Genus: Tuxentius
- Species: T. kaffana

Binomial name
- Tuxentius kaffana (Talbot, 1935)

Synonyms
- Castalius ertli kaffana Talbot, 1935

Species of butterfly

Tuxentius kaffana is a butterfly in the family Lycaenidae. It is found in south-western Ethiopia.
