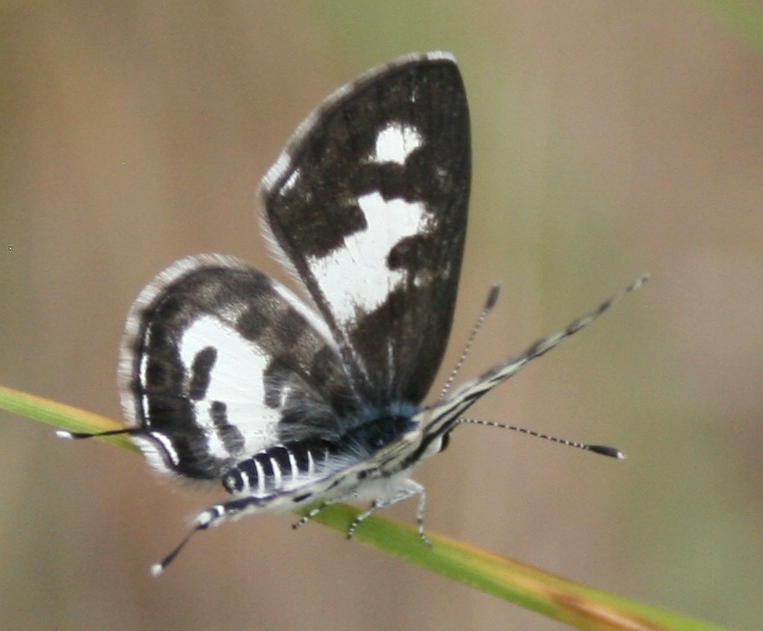

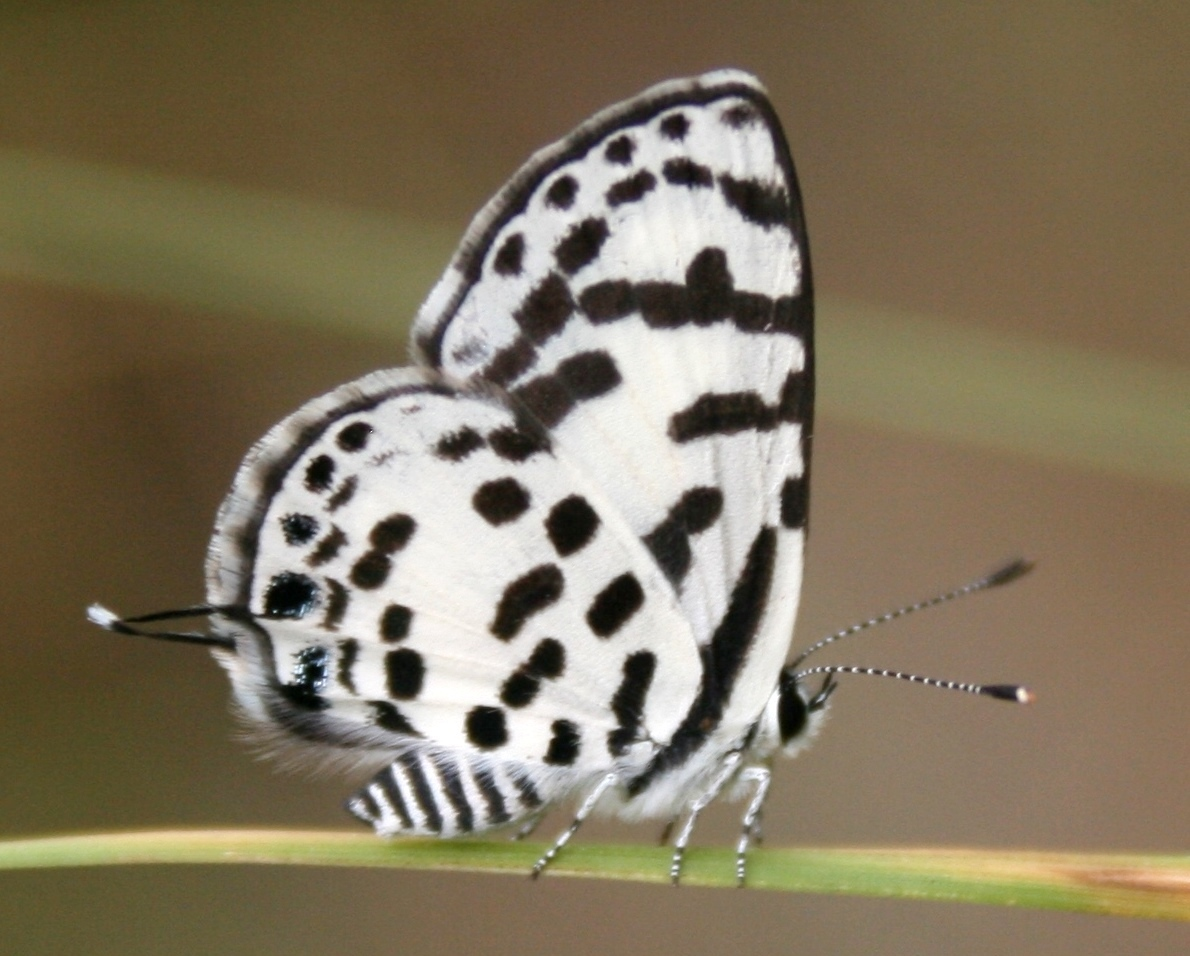
- T. c. calice in South Africa

Scientific classification
- Domain: Eukaryota
- Kingdom: Animalia
- Phylum: Arthropoda
- Class: Insecta
- Order: Lepidoptera
- Family: Lycaenidae
- Genus: Tuxentius
- Species: T. calice

Binomial name
- Tuxentius calice (Hopffer, 1855)
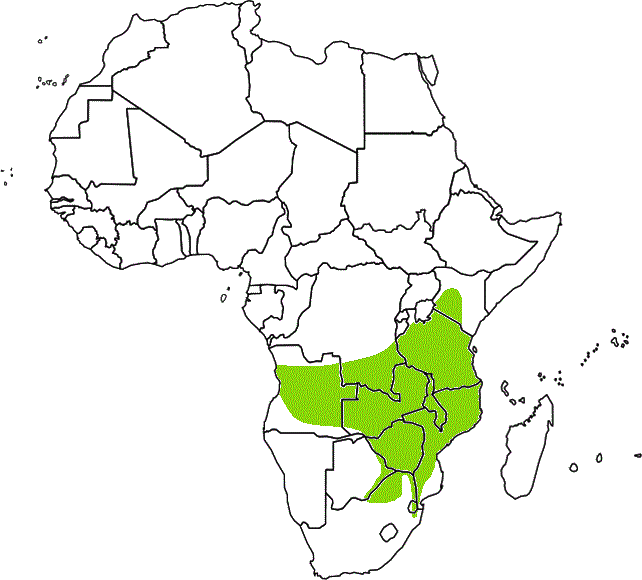
- approximate range

Synonyms
- Lycaena calice Hopffer, 1855; Castalius calice; Castalius gregorii Butler, 1894

= Tuxentius calice =

White pie

Species of butterfly

Tuxentius calice, the white pie, is a butterfly of the family Lycaenidae. It is found in Africa southwards of the equator.

The wingspan is 21–24 mm for males and 21–25 mm for females. Adults are on wing year-round, but are most common from October to March.

The larvae feed on Ziziphus mucronata and probably other Ziziphus species.

== Subspecies ==
- Tuxentius calice calice — South Africa, Zimbabwe, Mozambique, Botswana, Zambia, southern Zaire (Shaba), Angola, Malawi, southern Tanzania
- Tuxentius calice gregorii (Butler, 1894) — northern Tanzania, central Kenya
