= Tuxentius stempfferi =

Scientific classification
- Kingdom: Animalia
- Phylum: Arthropoda
- Class: Insecta
- Order: Lepidoptera
- Family: Lycaenidae
- Genus: Tuxentius
- Species: T. stempfferi

Binomial name
- Tuxentius stempfferi (Kielland, 1976)

Synonyms
- Castalius stempfferi Kielland, 1976

Species of butterfly

Tuxentius stempfferi, the Stempffer's Pierrot, is a butterfly in the family Lycaenidae. It is found in Tanzania. The species is named after French entomologist Henri Stempffer.
