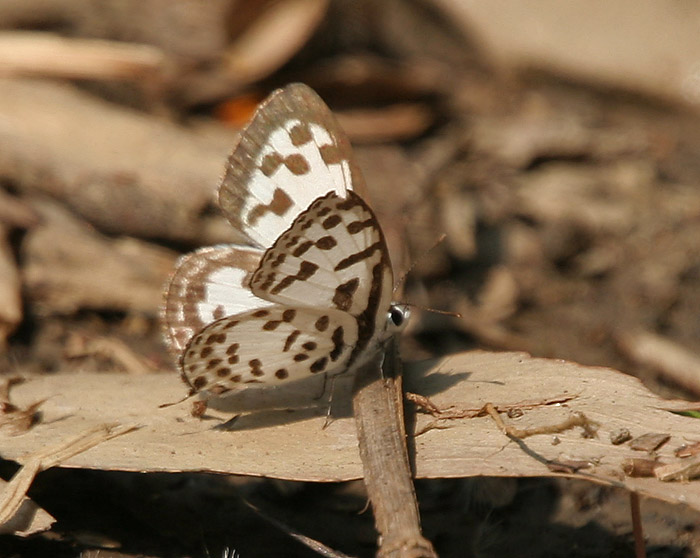
- Common pierrot (Castalius rosimon)

Scientific classification
- Kingdom: Animalia
- Phylum: Arthropoda
- Clade: Pancrustacea
- Class: Insecta
- Order: Lepidoptera
- Family: Lycaenidae
- Subfamily: Polyommatinae
- Tribe: Polyommatini
- Genus: Castalius; Hübner, 1819

Type species
- Papilio rosimon Fabricius, 1775

Diversity
- Four species (but see text)

= Castalius =

Butterfly genus in family Lycaenidae

Castalius is a butterfly genus in the family Lycaenidae. They are commonly known as Pierrots. This name is also often used for the very closely related genus Tarucus.

In fact, the delimitation of Castalius versus Tarucus is not yet fully resolved, with some species, such as the dark Pierrot (T. ananda), having been moved between the two genera repeatedly. Regardless of how this may turn out, the African species formerly placed in Castalius are now in Tuxentius (pied Pierrots) and Zintha (blue-eyed Pierrot), which are also very close relatives (in particular the former).

== Species ==
Only four species are placed in Castalius nowadays. But as noted above, it may be that Tarucus and the present genus are eventually regarded as synonymous. In that case, the older name Castalius would again apply to the two dozen species in question.

- Castalius clathratus (Holland, [1891]) Celebes
- Castalius fasciatus (Röber, 1887) Celebes
- Castalius fluvialis (Grose-Smith, 1895) Celebes
- Castalius rosimon (Fabricius, 1775) – common Pierrot
