= Pye =

Pye or PYE can refer to:

== Businesses ==
- Pye (electronics company), an electronics manufacturer
- Pye Records, a record label
  - Pye International Records, its subsidiary

== Fictional characters ==
- Jerry Pye and Ginger Pye, a boy and a dog in Ginger Pye, a 1951 children's novel by Eleanor Estes
- the protagonist of Mr Pye, a 1953 novel by Mervyn Peake
- Pye, a fictional owl in the Guardians of Ga'Hoole series

== People ==
- Pye (surname)
- Pye Dubois (fl. 1976–1996), Canadian poet and rock lyricist
- Pye Hastings (born 1947), British singer and guitarist
- Pye Min (1619–1672), a king of the Toungoo dynasty in Burma

== Places ==
- Pye (Osnabrück district), a German suburb
- Pye Bridge railway station, Derbyshire, English Midlands
- Pye Corner railway station, Newport, south Wales, (National Rail station code: PYE)
- Pye Corner in the City of London, location of the Golden Boy of Pye Corner
- Pye Road, an ancient Roman road in southern England
- Tongareva Airport, Penrhyn Island, Cook Islands (IATA: PYE)

== Other uses ==
- Pye baronets, two titles of English nobility
- Pye dog, or Indian pariah dog
