= Pie Magazine =

Canadian luxury lifestyle magazine

PIE Magazine is a Canadian luxury lifestyle magazine that considers itself a "book-o-zine". It is released three times each year and is produced in Barrie, Ontario.

== History and profile ==
PIE Magazine was founded in 2009. Each issue features original editorial content covering lifestyle, personalities, profiles, entertainment, travel, sports, automobiles, fashion, music, arts, politics, leisure, local highlights, home design and wellness.

The editor-in-chief of PIE Magazine is Sandra Roberts. She is also the publisher and C.E.O of the magazine. Roberts is also the editor-in-chief of Imago zine Inc., parent company of PIE magazine, as well as being a fashion stylist and creative director.

The magazine has several contributors, and is distributed through Disticor direct and available at Chapters, Indigo, various hotspots, events, tradeshows and major bookstores throughout Ontario.
