= Pie Corbett =

- Born: Pie Corbett; 72; Sedlescombe, East Sussex, England
- Education: East Sussex College of Higher Education
- Occupations: Writer, poet and educationist.
- Writing career
- Subjects: Primary Education; Literacy; Grammar; Creative Writing
- Notable works: Creating Storytellers and Writers; Inspiring Creative Writers.
- Website: www.talk4writing.com

Pie Corbett (born 1954) is an English educationist, author and poet who has written or edited more than 250 books.

Corbett is best known for developing Talk for Writing, an approach to teaching writing that is widely used in UK primary schools. His work promotes creative approaches to classroom teaching, particularly through storytelling.

Corbett previously worked as a primary school teacher, headteacher, lecturer and Ofsted inspector. He has also been an educational adviser to the UK government.

== Early life and education ==
Pie Corbett was born and raised on a farm in Sedlescombe, East Sussex, where he was one of five brothers. After leaving school, he studied Education at East Sussex College of Higher Education.

== Career ==
=== Writing ===
Corbett has written and edited more than 250 books, including poetry collections, anthologies and educational resources for teachers.

His educational works include Creating Storytellers and Writers, Talk for Writing Across the Curriculum and Talk for Writing in the Early Years, all co-authored with Julia Strong.

He co-authored Inspiring Creative Writers and Creating Curious Readers with Jamie Thomas. He also co-authored The Book of Dragons with Melanie Corbett.

His poetry collections include Evidence of Dragons, Catalysts: Poems for Writing and Dragon Cat. He has also compiled anthologies including A First Poetry Book and The Works series. He has contributed regularly to the Times Educational Supplement.

Corbett has cited Ted Hughes’ Poetry in the Making, as an important influence on his approach to encouraging children’s writing.

In 2003, Poems for Year 4, an anthology selected by Corbett and published by Macmillan, was shortlisted for the inaugural Centre for Literacy in Primary Education Poetry Award for children's poetry.

In 2005, Corbett's Story Maker's Chest, a creative-writing resource produced by Philip & Tacey, won the Education Resources Awards for Best Primary Resource. The resource was designed to support children's storytelling and creative writing through character, setting and plot prompts and other classroom activities. It was later updated as Pie Corbett's Story Writing Box.

In 2007, Corbett wrote the teachers' book accompanying the BBC educational poetry resource Let's Write Poetry, published by BBC Active. The associated BBC Two series, Let's Write Poetry: The Big Slam, used performances and workshops by children's poets to support poetry writing in primary schools.

=== Teaching ===
Corbett began his career as a primary school teacher and later worked as a headteacher, lecturer and Ofsted inspector. While working at the University of Gloucestershire, he created the Articled Teacher Scheme, an alternative model of initial teacher training.

Corbett has advised UK governments on education and contributed to the National Literacy Strategy, where he helped establish a prominent place for poetry in the curriculum. He also was the inspiration behind the Storymaking Schools Programme for the Story Museum. Corbett helped advise on its design and ran some teacher workshops.

In 2007 and 2008, Corbett worked with the government’s The National Strategies to introduce Talk for Writing through regional workshops and professional-development materials. This work included a classroom DVD demonstrating ways to encourage pupils’ writing, which was distributed to primary schools through the National Strategies.

Corbett subsequently developed the Primary Writing Project with John Stannard CBE, the first director of England’s National Literacy Strategy. The whole-school programme aimed to motivate children and teachers as writers, improve classroom practice and raise standards in writing.

In 2024, Corbett contributed to the work of the Commission on the Future of Oracy Education in England through a Commission Conversation with its chair, Geoff Barton. In 2025, he was consulted regarding the development of the Department for Education’s Writing Framework for primary schools.

=== Online teaching and broadcasting ===
During the COVID-19 school closures in 2020, Corbett co-founded RadioBlogging.net. The free daily internet radio programme encouraged primary-school children to write through language games, creative exercises and contributions from guest authors. Corbett presented 64 broadcasts.

RadioBlogging was followed by TeachingLive, an online programme created and delivered by Corbett, John Sutton and David Mitchell. It combined live creative-writing lessons with a moderated blogging platform through which children could publish their work and receive feedback.

During the school closures, Corbett and Talk for Writing also produced 40 free English home-learning workbooks. Schools and families using the resources were invited to make voluntary donations to Great Ormond Street Hospital Children’s Charity and the NSPCC, raising more than £30,000.

== Talk for Writing ==
Corbett developed Talk for Writing through his work with teachers and schools, building on classroom practice in storytelling, spoken rehearsal and the study of model texts. The research-informed approach has continued to be refined through its use in classrooms and the work of a national network of Talk for Writing Centres.

Talk for Writing was introduced through regional workshops delivered by Corbett in collaboration with The National Strategies in 2007 and 2008. Teachers subsequently developed the approach within their own classrooms and schools, and it became widely used in UK primary education.

The teaching process moves pupils from dependence towards independent writing. Children begin by learning and discussing a model text through an imitation phase. They then adapt its structure and language during the innovation phase before applying what they have learnt to original, independent writing. Shared writing, guided practice and formative assessment are used throughout the process.

The approach has been adapted for different ages and areas of the curriculum, including early-years education and non-fiction writing.

Corbett and Jamie Thomas later developed Talk for Reading, which applies related principles to reading comprehension and aims to develop critical, thoughtful and independent readers.

== Awards and honours ==
Corbett was awarded an honorary Doctor of Letters by the University of Winchester for services to poetry, storytelling and creative teaching.

In 2016, The Open University awarded him the honorary degree of Doctor of the University.

In 2009, Corbett received the English Association’s Fred Inglis Award for his outstanding contribution to children’s poetry.

== Selected bibliography ==
=== Talk for Writing and teaching resources ===
- How to Teach Fiction Writing at Key Stage 2 (2001)
- How to Teach Story Writing at Key Stage 1 (2003)
- Talk for Writing Across the Curriculum, with Julia Strong (2011; revised edition 2020)
- Talk for Writing in the Early Years, with Julia Strong (2016)
- Creating Storytellers and Writers, with Julia Strong (first published 2017; sixth edition 2025)
- Transforming Learning Across the Curriculum, with Julia Strong (2020)
- Creating Curious Readers, with Jamie Thomas (2024)
- The Book of Dragons, with Melanie Corbett (2024)
- Inspiring Creative Writers: A Talk for Writing Guide to Fiction Planning, with Jamie Thomas (2025)

=== Jumpstart! series ===
- Jumpstart! Literacy: Games and Activities for Ages 7–14 (2004)
- Jumpstart! Poetry: Games and Activities for Ages 7–12 (2008)
- Jumpstart! Storymaking: Games and Activities for Ages 7–12 (2009)
- Jumpstart! Grammar: Games and Activities for Ages 6–14, with Julia Strong (2016 edition)

=== Poetry collections ===
- Rice, Pie and Moses, with John Rice and Brian Moses (1995)
- Evidence of Dragons (2011)
- Catalysts: Poems for Writing (2022)
- Dragon Cat (2025)

=== Poetry anthologies ===
- The Works: Key Stage 1 (2006)
- The Works: Key Stage 2 (2006)
- A First Poetry Book, with Gaby Morgan (2012)
