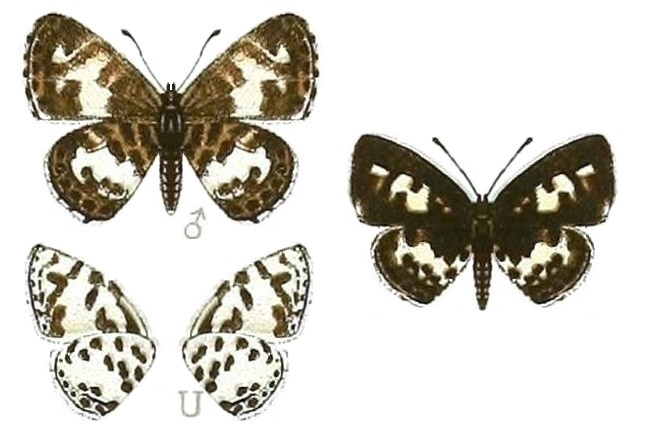
- T. calice (left) and T. melaena (right)

Scientific classification
- Kingdom: Animalia
- Phylum: Arthropoda
- Clade: Pancrustacea
- Class: Insecta
- Order: Lepidoptera
- Family: Lycaenidae
- Subfamily: Polyommatinae
- Tribe: Polyommatini
- Genus: Tuxentius; Larsen, 1982

Diversity
- 11 species

= Tuxentius =

Butterfly genus in family Lycaenidae

Tuxentius is a butterfly genus in the family Lycaenidae. They are commonly known as pied Pierrots or pies. Contained in this genus are the African species formerly placed in Castalius, except the blue-eyed Pierrot (sometimes called blue pied Pierrot) which is separated in Zintha.

== Species ==
The members of genus Tuxentius are:

- Tuxentius calice (Hopffer, 1855) – white Pierrot
- Tuxentius carana (Hewitson, 1876) – forest pied Pierrot
- Tuxentius cretosus (Butler, 1876) – savanna pied Pierrot
- Tuxentius ertli (Aurivillius, 1907) – Ertli's Pierrot
- Tuxentius gabrieli Balint, 1999 – Gabriel's Pierrot
- Tuxentius hesperis (Vári, 1976) – western pie
- Tuxentius kaffana (Talbot, 1935)
- Tuxentius margaritaceus (Sharpe, 1892) – mountain pied Pierrot
- Tuxentius melaena (Trimen, 1887) – dark pied Pierrot
- Tuxentius stempfferi (Kielland, 1976) – Stempffer's Pierrot
