= Ntot Ngijol Jean Pie =

Cameroonian footballer

Personal information
- Full name: Ntot Ngijol Jean Pie
- Date of birth: 23 September 1986 (age 40)
- Place of birth: Yaoundé, Cameroon
- Height: 1.84 m (6 ft 1/2 in)
- Position: Striker

Team information
- Current team: Khonkaen Football Club

Youth career
- 1996–2002: Tonnerre Yaoundé
- 2004: Al-Ahly

Senior career*
Years	Team	Apps	(Gls)
2002–2004	Tonnerre Yaoundé		
2004	Al-Ahly Reserve Team		
2008–2009	Singburi F.C.		
2009–2010	Phichit F.C.		
2010–	Khonkaen F.C.	0	(0)
- * Club domestic league appearances and goals as of 31 January 2010 (UTC) ‡ National team caps and goals as of 31 January 2010

Ntot Ngijol Jean Pie (Thai: ตอต ชีโฌล์ ฌ็อง ปี) His nickname is Jean (or John in English) (born 23 September 1986 in Yaoundé, Cameroon) is a football striker from Cameroon who plays for Khon Kaen F.C. in the Thai Division 1 League as a striker.
