= Pye (surname) =

Pye is an English surname. Notable people with the surname include:

- A. Kenneth Pye (1931–1994), American academic
- Bill Pye (1912–1996), Australian politician
- Brad Pye Jr. (1931–2020), American journalist
- Charles Pye (1820–1876), British soldier, Victoria Cross recipient
- David Pye (engineer) (1886–1960), British mechanical engineer and academic administrator
- David Pye (furniture designer) (1914–1993), British furniture designer
- Elizabeth Pye (born 1946), British conservator and academic
- Ernie Pye (1880–1923), Australian rules footballer
- Ethel Pye (1882–1960), British sculptor and jewellery designer
- Harry Pye (born 1973), British artist
- Harry Pye (footballer) (1880–1953), Australian Rules footballer
- Henry James Pye (1745–1813), English poet laureate
- Jack Pye (1903–1985), born John Pye, British wrestler
- James Pye (1801–1884), Australian orchardist and politician
- Jerry Pye, Canadian politician
- Jesse Pye (1919–1984), English footballer
- John Pye (1782–1874), British landscape engraver
- Len Pye (1911–1989), Australian rules footballer
- Lloyd Pye (1946–2013), American author and paranormal researcher
- Lucian Pye (1921–2008), American political scientist and sinologist
- Pye Min (1619–1672), King of Burma
- Patrick Pye (1929–2018), British sculptor, painter and stained glass artist working in Ireland
- Robert Pye (Roundhead) (c. 1620–1701), English politician who fought on the Parliamentary side in the English Civil War
- Robert Pye (Royalist) (1585–1662), English courtier, administrator and politician who supported the Royalist cause in the English Civil War
- Scott Pye (born 1990), Australian racing driver
- Thomas Pye (1708/09–1785), British naval officer and politician
- Walter Pye (lawyer) (1571–1635), English barrister, courtier, administrator and politician
- Walter Pye (Royalist) (1610–1659), English politician, supported the Royalist cause in the Civil War
- Wendy Pye (born 1943), New Zealand educational publisher
- William Pye (priest) (died 1557), English priest
- William Pye (sculptor) (born 1938), English sculptor
- William George Pye (1869–1949), British businessman, founder of Pye Ltd
- William S. Pye (1880–1959), US Navy admiral
- Willie James Pye (1965–2024), American convicted murderer

== See also ==
- Pie (surname)
