= Elizabeth Pye =

British conservator and academic

Elizabeth Pye FSA
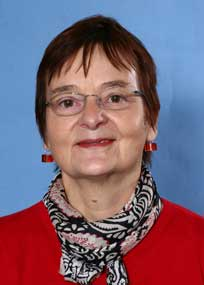
- Born: January 1946 (age 79)
- Occupation: Conservator

Academic background
- Education: University of London

Elizabeth Mary Pye, FSA (born January 1946) is a British conservator and academic. She had studied prehistoric archaeology at the University of Edinburgh, under Stuart Piggott, and conservation at the University of London, before becoming a conservator at the British Museum. She was Professor of Archaeological and Museum Conservation at UCL Institute of Archaeology until she retired in 2013: she is now emeritus professor.

== Early life ==
Elizabeth's interest in archaeology when she was five years old and given children's books on early people. Later, before university, she was in small local excavations, and then with Henry Cleere at Bardown, and John Alexander from the University of Cambridge. These experiences let her to choose to study archaeology at university. When she was 15 her father brought Conservation of Antiquities, home from his college library and reading it sparked her interest in conservation.

== Awards and recognition ==
On 3 March 1997, Pye was elected a Fellow of the Society of Antiquaries of London (FSA). In 2015, she was awarded the Conservation and Heritage Management Award by the Archaeological Institute of America for her "groundbreaking efforts to transform the field of objects conservation into a science-based discipline".

== Selected works ==
- Pye, Elizabeth (2001). Caring for the past: issues in conservation for archaeology and museums. London: James & James. ISBN 978-1902916101.
- Pye, Elizabeth, ed. (2007). The power of touch: handling objects in museum and heritage contexts. Walnut Creek, CA: Left Coast Press. ISBN 978-1598743036.
