= The National Strategies =

The National Strategies were professional programmes aiming for improvements in the quality of learning and teaching in schools in England, delivered on behalf of the Department for Children, Schools and Families. The National Strategies were first introduced in 1998 and were a key national delivery vehicle for many new and existing government learning priorities.

The programmes provided a mix of resources and services that supported improvements in the quality of learning and teaching in schools, colleges and early years settings. A key aim of The National Strategies was to help these educational settings raise children's standards of attainment and improve their life chances.

The National Strategies mission was “To raise standards of achievement and rates of progression for children and young people in all phases and settings through personalised learning with a particular focus on the core subjects and early years”. The National Strategies web area, which was closed in 2011, was recognised by the Web Marketing Association Awards as ‘outstanding’ in the categories ‘Best Government Website’ and ‘Best Education Website’.

== See also ==
- Primary National Strategy
