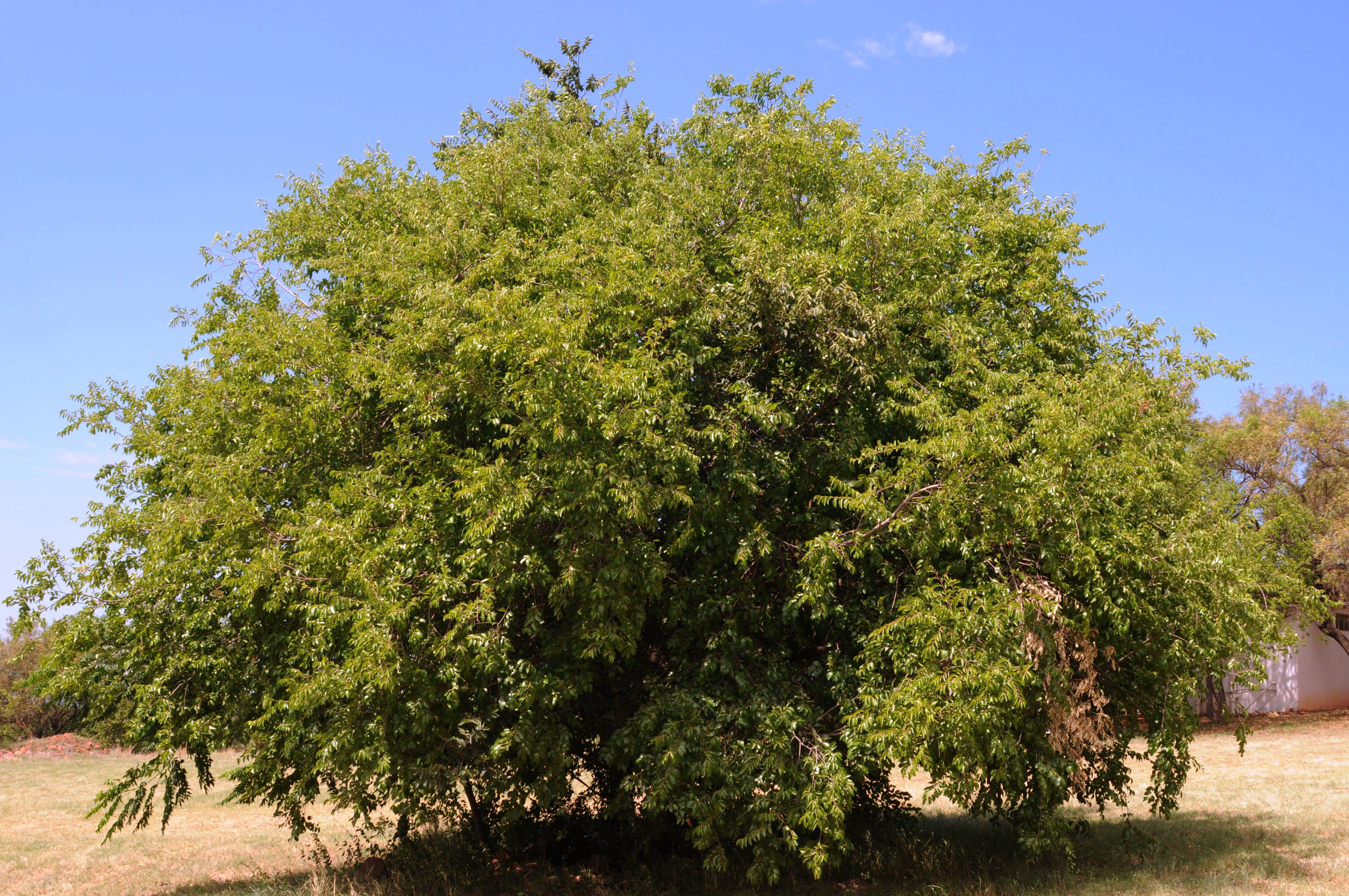

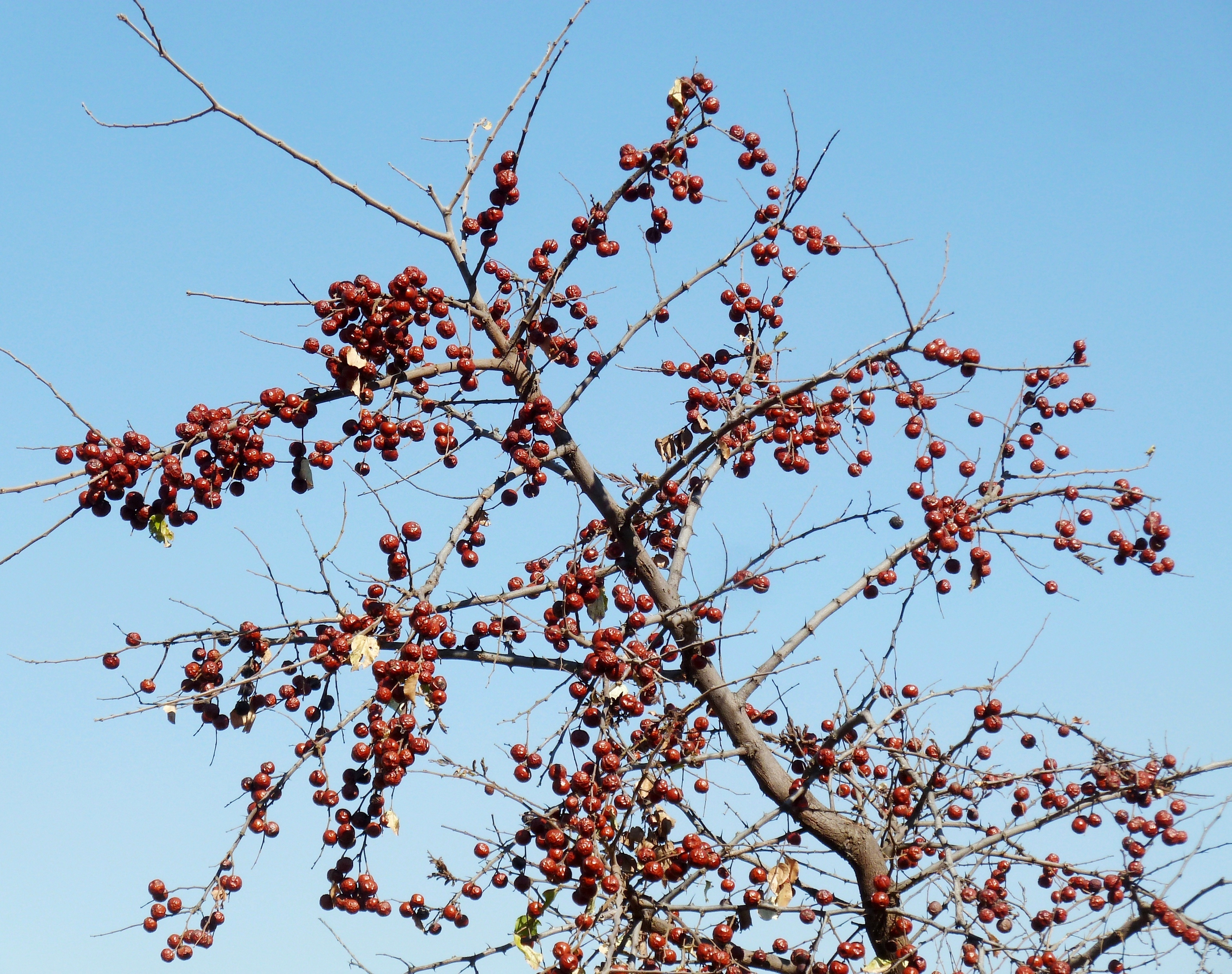
- habit (summer) and fruit (winter)

Conservation status
- Least Concern (IUCN 3.1)

Scientific classification
- Kingdom: Plantae
- Clade: Tracheophytes
- Clade: Angiosperms
- Clade: Eudicots
- Clade: Rosids
- Order: Rosales
- Family: Rhamnaceae
- Genus: Ziziphus
- Species: Z. mucronata

Binomial name
- Ziziphus mucronata Willd.

Subspecies
- Ziziphus mucronata subsp. mucronata; Ziziphus mucronata subsp. rhodesica R.B.Drumm.

Synonyms
- synonyms of subsp. mucronata: Ziziphus adelensis Delile; Ziziphus baclei DC.; Ziziphus bubalina Licht. ex Schult.; Ziziphus madecassa H.Perrier; Ziziphus mitis A.Rich.; Ziziphus mucronata var. glabrata Sond.; Ziziphus mucronata var. glauca Schinz; Ziziphus mucronata var. inermis Engl.; Ziziphus mucronata f. obliqua Kuntze; Ziziphus mucronata var. pubescens Sond.; Ziziphus mucronata f. pubescens (Sond.) Chiov.; Ziziphus mucronata f. subcordata Kuntze

= Ziziphus mucronata =

Buffalo thorn

Species of tree

Ziziphus mucronata, known as the buffalo thorn, is a species of tree in the family Rhamnaceae, native to southern Africa. It is deciduous and may grow up to 17 metres tall. It can survive in a variety of soil types, occurring in many habitats, mostly open woodlands, often on soils deposited by rivers, and grows frequently on termite mounds. Its Zulu name “umLahlankosi” alludes to its use as a grave marker for tribal chiefs, while the Afrikaans name “Blinkblaar-wag-'n-bietjie” alludes to the shiny light green leaves and the hooked thorns.

== Description ==
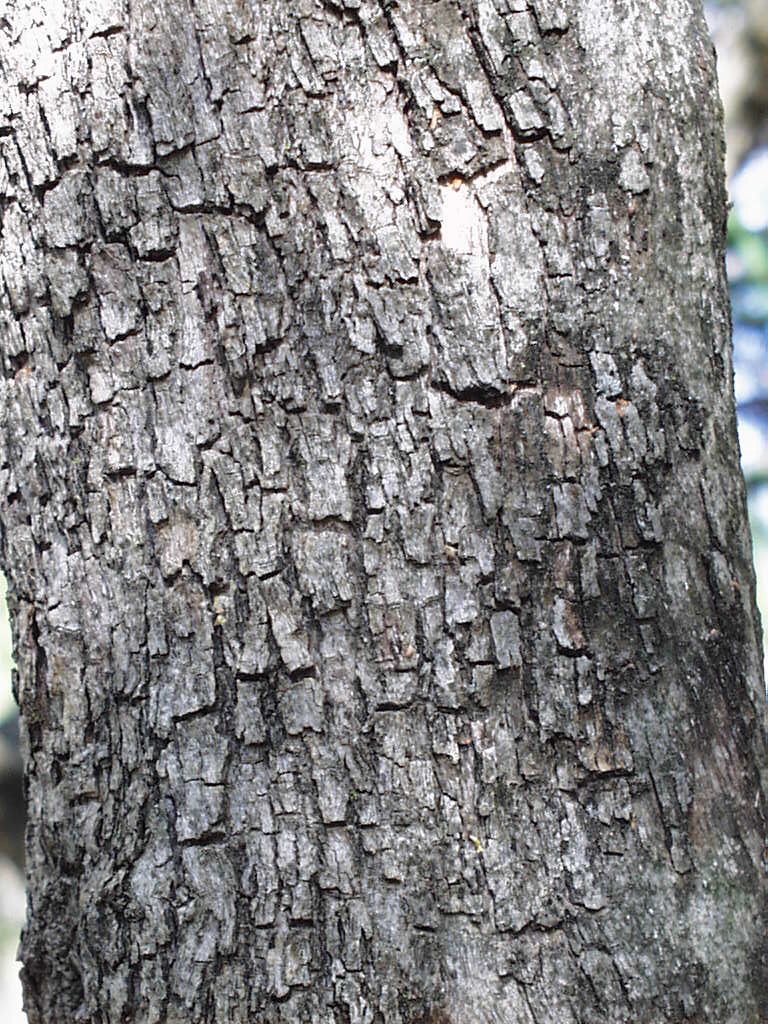
The bark of the tree

The buffalo thorn is a small to medium size tree, reaching a height of about 10 metres (33 ft), or rarely 17 metres (56 ft). The bark is a red-brown (on young stems) or roughly mottled grey, cracked in small rectangular blocks revealing a stringy red underbark. The bark becomes rough and turns to a dark grey or brown colour. The shrub or tree has distinctive zigzag branchlets, armed with pairs of thorns, one hooked and the other straight. In some instances adult trees lose their thorns completely. The fruit vary in size but regionally may grow larger than grape, and ripen to a deep brown-red colour. From October to April the greenish yellow flowers with silvery sheen are found in dense bunches in the axils of the leaves. Fruit are found from February to August.

== Ecology ==
Their small, greenish yellow flowers attract many insects. They produce abundant nectar and consequently yield honey. Several species of bird feed on the brownish-red fruit. The leaves as well as fruit are also sought after by wild animals and domestic stock. Giraffes and impala browse the leaves.

== Uses ==
It makes a good perimeter barrier as its thorns are profuse on young shoots and are difficult to untangle because one points forward while the other points backward. Certain tribes believe the tree is safe to use as a shelter against lightning, and it may be planted as a grave marker for a deceased chief.

=== Medical uses ===
A blend made from the roots is used as a painkiller and for dysentery while the bark and leaves are used for respiratory ailments and sepsis on the skin. A paste made from the roots and leaves will treat boils, sores and swelling. The above may be attributed to the peptide alkaloids and antifungals isolated from the bark and leaves. Branches are used for protection of cattle kraal and sometimes on the graves of dead tribal members. The wood is used for implements and fuel. The leaves bark and roots are used medicinally and magically for pain relief, respiratory complaints and skin infections, especially for chest and stomach disorders. The leaves if crushed may be used to stop bleeding. Steam baths from the bark are used to purify and improve the complexion. In East Africa, roots are used for treating snake bites.

=== Nutritional uses ===
The leaves are edible and can be cooked into spinach. The seeds can be roasted and ground as a substitute for coffee. The Ovambo people use it to distill ombike, a traditional liquor. The leaves and fruits are also a valuable source of forage for livestock.

== Cultural practices and beliefs ==
Historically the Zulus planted a buffalo thorn on the grave of a deceased chief as a reminder of where the chief was buried, hence the Zulu name “umLahlankosi”, meaning “that which buries chief”. Even today a branch from the buffalo thorn is used to retrieve the spirit of a deceased person from where he or she died. A family member will go to the place where death occurred carrying a branch of the buffalo thorn which the spirit is able to hold onto. This will be taken back to the deceased homestead and the spirit will be given a new resting place. During the transportation of the spirit the carrier will at no time look backwards, he will pay for two seats on a bus or a taxi and communicate with the spirit explaining exactly what is transpiring. If for example they are to cross a river the holder will tell the spirit “we are now crossing the river, we will get a lift on the other side”, etc.

According to a Zulu belief, a person standing under a buffalo thorn during a lightning storm is protected from a possible strike, as the tree is immune to lightning. They also believe that if buffalo thorn is cut down during summer a drought or hail storm will occur. When a stock owner died, and was buried according to custom, within the cattle or goat kraal, some branches were placed on the grave so that the animals nibbled on leaves and twigs, and so understood that their master had died. In other parts, Africans drag a branch around the village to protect it from evil spirits, as it is believed to keep evil spirits at bay.

== Gallery ==
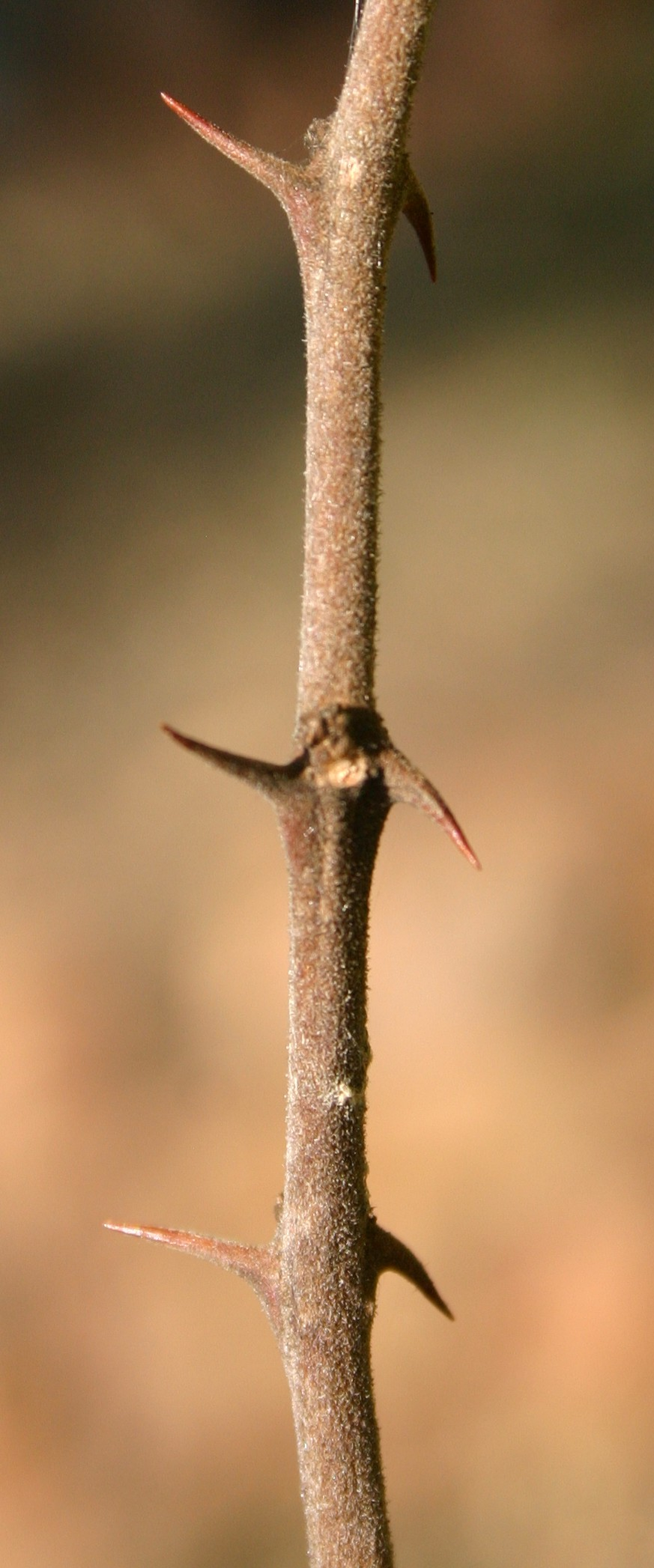
Straight and hooked thorns in pairs

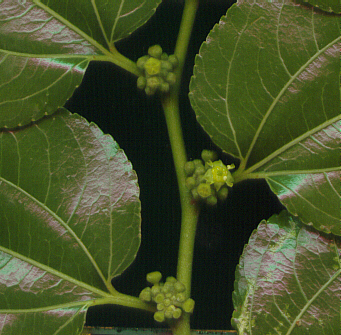
Flowers in leaf axils

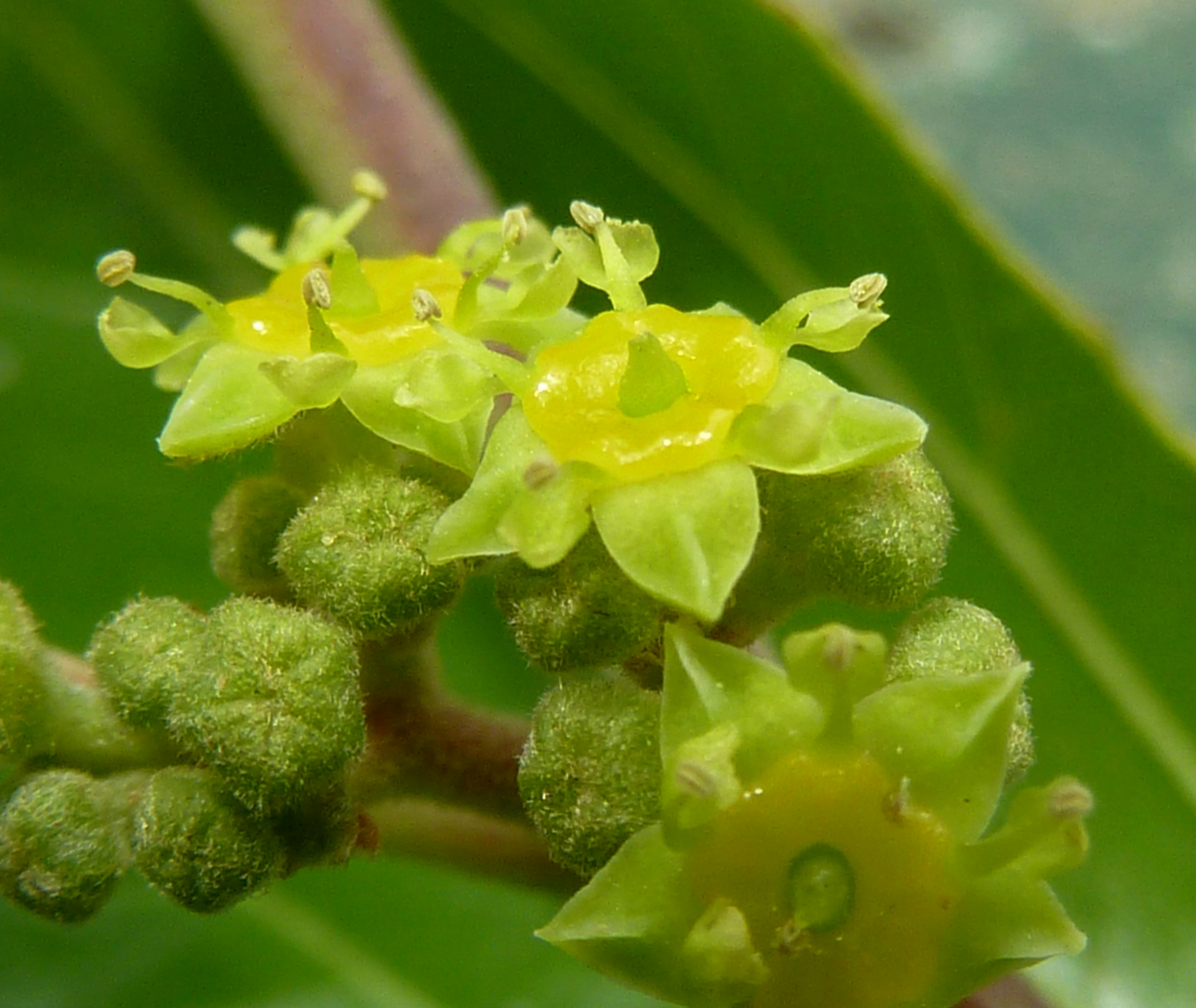
Close up of flowers

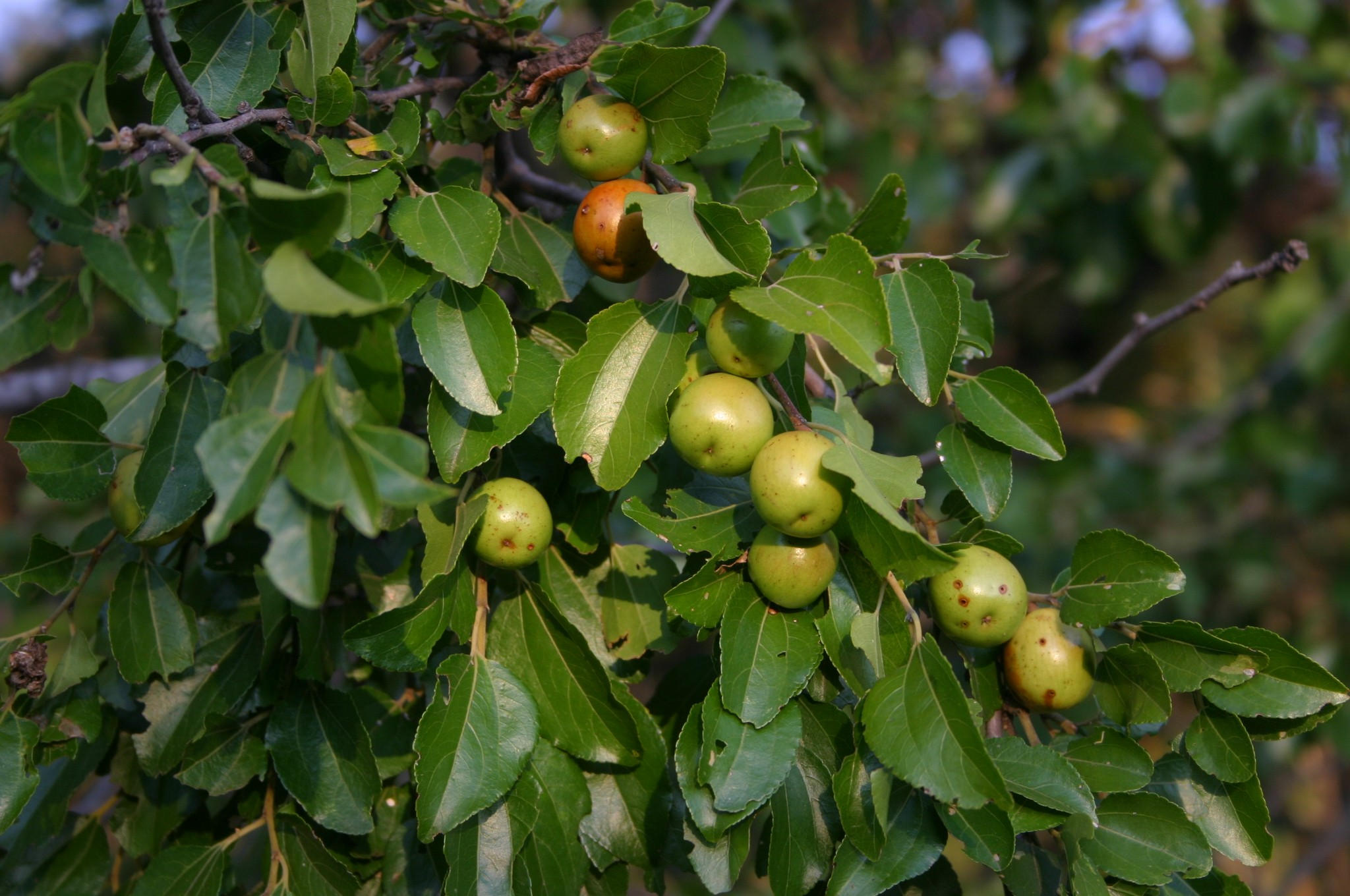
Smooth, hard fruit and glossy foliage
