= Cadillac XLR =

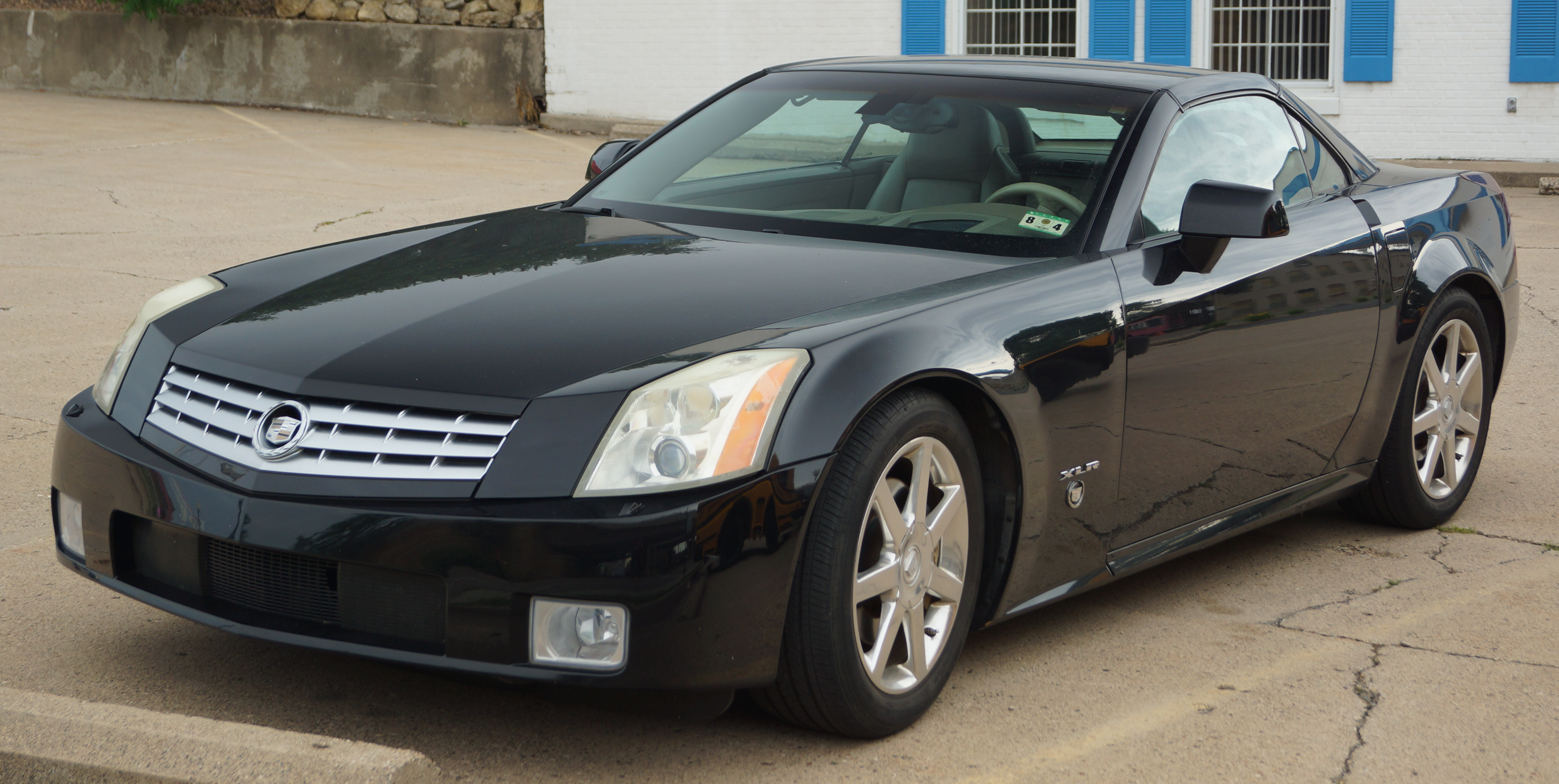

Overview
- Manufacturer: Cadillac (General Motors)
- Production: 2003–2009
- Model years: 2004–2009
- Assembly: United States: Bowling Green, Kentucky (Bowling Green Assembly Plant)
- Designer: Tom Peters (prod. exterior: 1999, 2000); Kip Wasenko (Evoq Concept: 1998; chief designer of prod: 2000); Wayne Cherry (design director)

Body and chassis
- Class: Grand tourer (S)
- Body style: 2-door roadster
- Layout: FR layout
- Platform: Y-body/GMX215
- Related: Chevrolet Corvette (C5); Chevrolet Corvette (C6)

Powertrain
- Engine: 4.6 L Northstar V8; 4.4 L Northstar Supercharged V8
- Transmission: 5-speed 5L50 automatic; 6-speed 6L80 automatic

Dimensions
- Wheelbase: 105.7 in (2,685 mm)
- Length: 177.7 in (4,514 mm)
- Width: 72.3 in (1,836 mm)
- Height: 50.4 in (1,280 mm)
- Curb weight: 3,840 lb (1,742 kg)

Chronology
- Predecessor: Cadillac Allanté

The Cadillac XLR is a convertible car manufactured and marketed by Cadillac from 2003 to 2009 across a single generation. It is a two-seat roadster and has a power retractable hardtop. The XLR was introduced at the 2003 North American International Auto Show as a halo model for Cadillac, and began production for the 2004 model year. The design was inspired by the 1999 Evoq concept.

The XLR shares much of its construction design with the C6 Chevrolet Corvette that was introduced one year later, including its GM Y platform, hydroformed steel perimeter side rails, folded steel backbone, tubular steel front and rear bulkheads, aluminum windshield structure, magnesium steering-column mounts, aluminum/balsawood composite floorboards and composite bodywork technology. Unique to the XLR are its engine, bodywork, interior, suspension settings, and power retractable hardtop. Both the XLR and C6 Corvette were manufactured at General Motors' Bowling Green Assembly, with the XLR manufactured at a dedicated work station adjacent to the Corvette assembly line, engineered to facilitate routing of componentry to the XLR's dedicated assembly station.

The XLR entered production a year before the Chevrolet, as the first production Cadillac with radar-based adaptive cruise control (ACC) or both heated and cooled seats — was subsequently nominated for the North American Car of the Year award for 2004. It has Bulgari-designed interior instruments, head-up display, adaptive suspension, rear-mounted transmission and near 50/50 front-to-rear weight distribution.

== Design ==
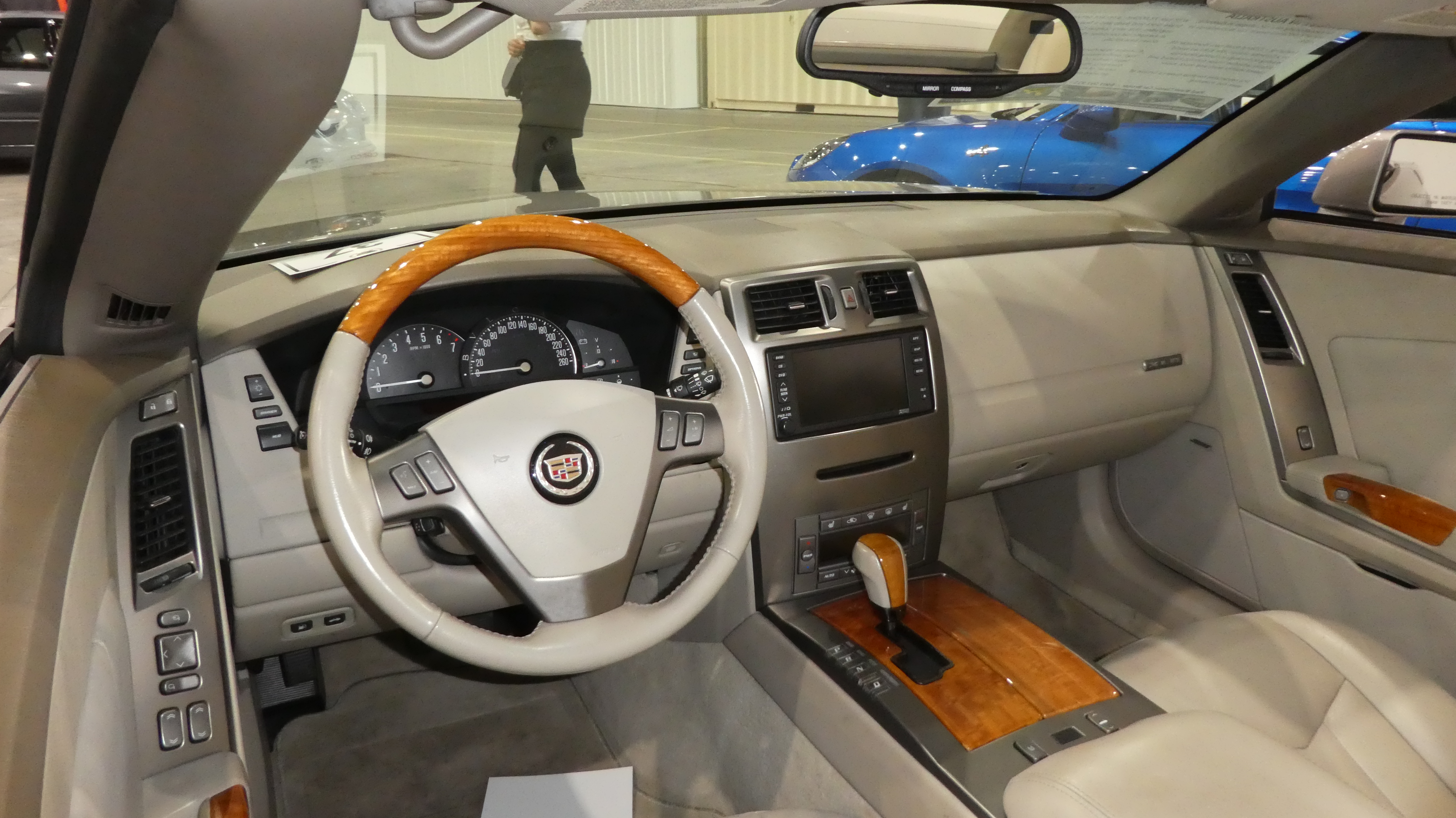
2004 Cadillac XLR interior

The XLR was marketed as a luxury roadster and offered numerous features either as standard equipment or as options, including a touchscreen GPS navigation radio with an AM/FM radio, CD changer, XM Satellite Radio, full voice control, Bose premium amplified audio system, adaptive cruise control, Bulgari-branded instrument panel cluster, OnStar, High Intensity Discharge (HID) front headlamps, perforated luxury leather-trimmed seating surfaces with power-adjustable, heated and cooled bucket seats with a driver's memory system, luxury carpeted floor mats with embroidered "XLR" logos, premium aluminum-alloy wheels, and wood interior trim.

The XLR featured adaptive suspension with magneto-rheological shock absorber fluid for enhanced ride control. The system, marketed as "Magnetic Ride Control", used four wheel-to-body displacement sensors to measure wheel motion over the road surface and responds by adjusting the shock damping almost instantly. The shock absorbers were filled with a fluid containing suspended iron particles responsive to magnetic signals. The system constantly monitored motion and changed the damping forces at all four corners of the vehicle to modulate body motion for quick maneuvers or uneven road surfaces.

Whereas the C6 Chevrolet Corvette was powered by a 6.0 L GM LS2 V8 engine and offered with a six-speed manual transmission, the XLR featured Cadillac's 4.6 L Northstar V8 (supercharged in the XLR-V) and either a five-speed 5L50 automatic transmission, or a six-speed 6L80 automatic transmission. It produced 320 hp (239 kW) and 310 lb⋅ft (420 N⋅m) of torque in the standard trim. Optional XLR equipment included polished aluminum-alloy wheels, exterior and interior color options, and different interior trim options.

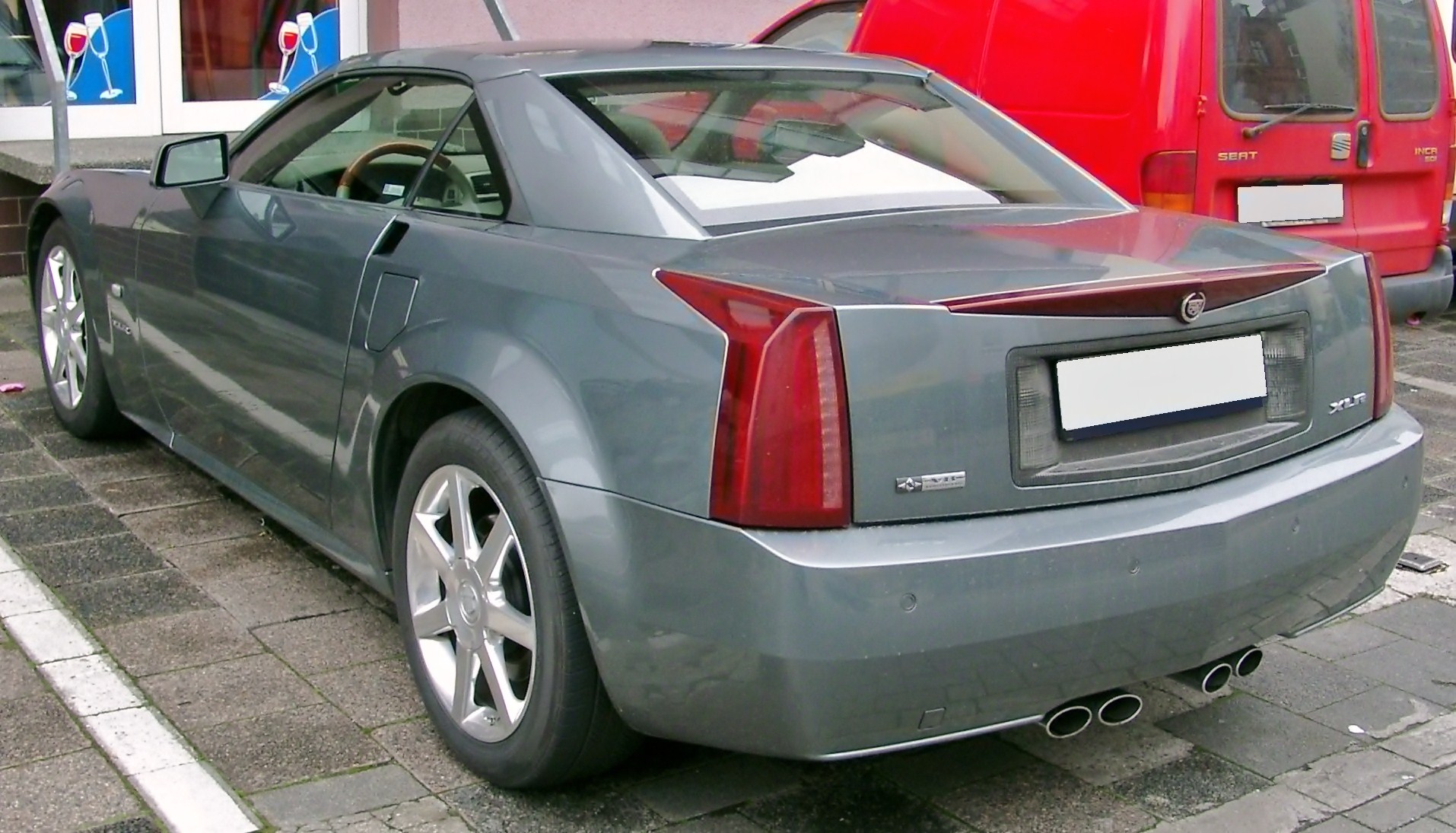
Rear view of a European-spec XLR

The XLR's fully automatic power retractable top required less than 30 seconds and 6 ft 10 1/2 in (2.1 m) of vertical clearance for its operation, with its cargo capacity reduced from 11.6 cubic feet to 4.4 cubic feet. The top, made of aluminum and magnesium with a composite plastic painted exterior, was engineered and manufactured by Magna Car Top Systems GmbH (Magna CTWS), co-located at Bowling Green Assembly, the same firm that supplies numerous manufacturers, e.g., the Mercedes-Benz SL. The system included a heated glass window and glass rear-quarter windows and opened remotely using the key fob, by pushing the dash-mounted button, or by a button on the trunk. The XLR featured Cadillac's traditional silver-painted upper "Egg Crate" (XLR) or chrome wire mesh (XLR-V) front grille.

For the 2009 model year, the XLR added a new front fascia, new rear fascia, and chrome side fender vents. Inside, Alcantara, a suede-like microfiber material, was added for the headliner. The interior added new instrument cluster trim rings with revised graphics (removal of the Bulgari logo) and new wood dashboard trims. XLR production ended on March 31, 2009.

The base price of the XLR in the United States went from $75,385 (equivalent to $128,437 in 2025) at launch to $86,215 (equivalent to $128,923 in 2025) by the end of its run in 2009.

== XLR-V ==
The Cadillac XLR-V is a high-performance variant of the XLR and part of the first-generation V-Series. Cadillac gave the public its first glimpse of the supercharged XLR-V in a commercial that aired during Super Bowl XXXIX on February 6, 2005. Super Bowl MVP Deion Branch was also awarded an XLR. The car was formally introduced at the 2005 New York International Auto Show.

The XLR-V used the same supercharged Northstar LC3 V8 as the STS-V, although output was reduced somewhat. For the XLR-V, the engine produced 443 hp (330 kW) and 414 lb⋅ft (561 N⋅m). The supercharger and four intercooler cores were built into the intake manifold. A six-speed automatic transmission, larger brakes from the Z51 Corvette, and 19-inch wheels were used.

The XLR-V could accelerate to 60 mph (97 km/h) in 4.6 seconds according to Car and Driver's tests. The magazine also timed it at 11.3 seconds to 100 mph (160 km/h) and recorded a 13.0 second quarter mile at 110 mph (180 km/h). Its top speed was electronically limited to 155 mph (249 km/h).

The base price of the XLR-V in the United States went from $97,485 (equivalent to $155,690 in 2025) at launch to $104,215 (equivalent to $155,839 in 2025) by the end of its run in 2009.

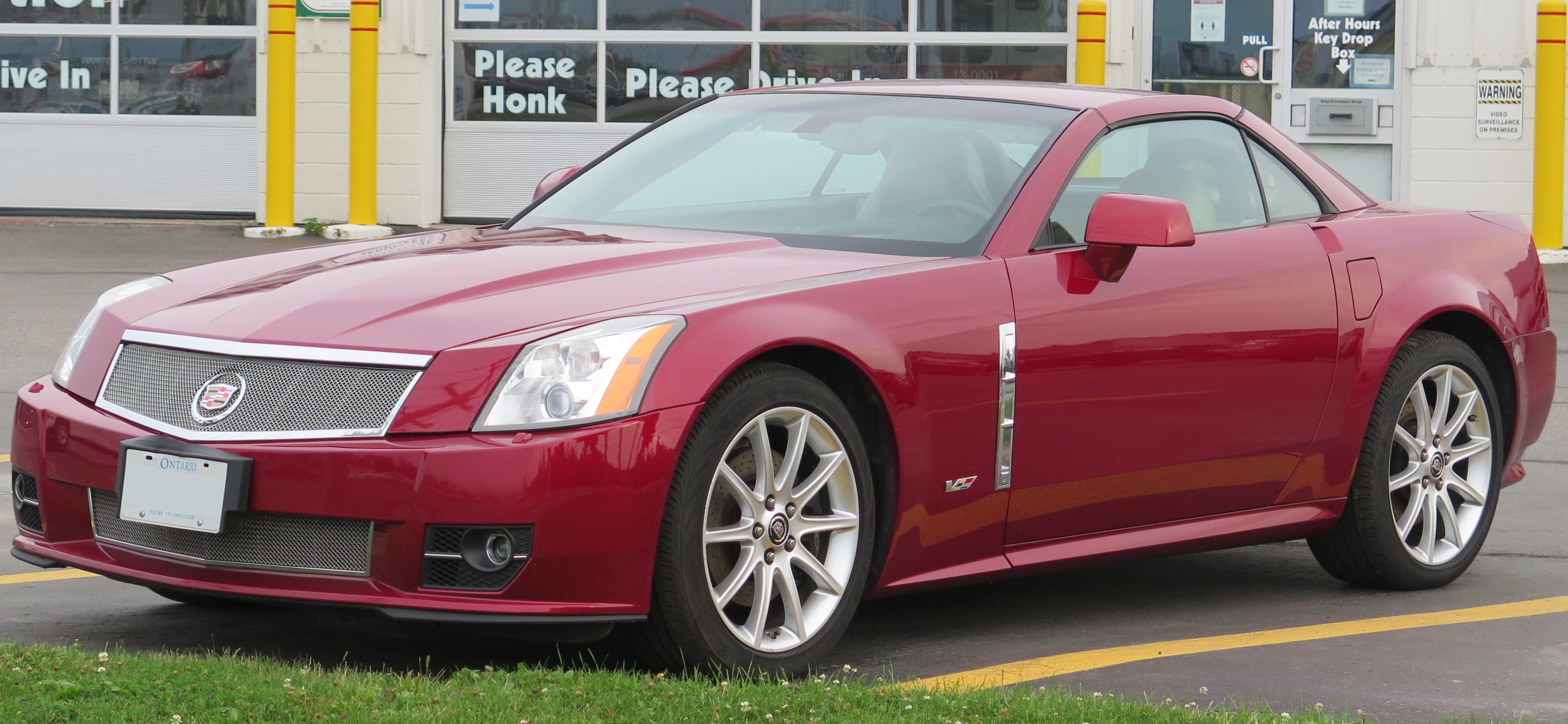
2009 XLR-V

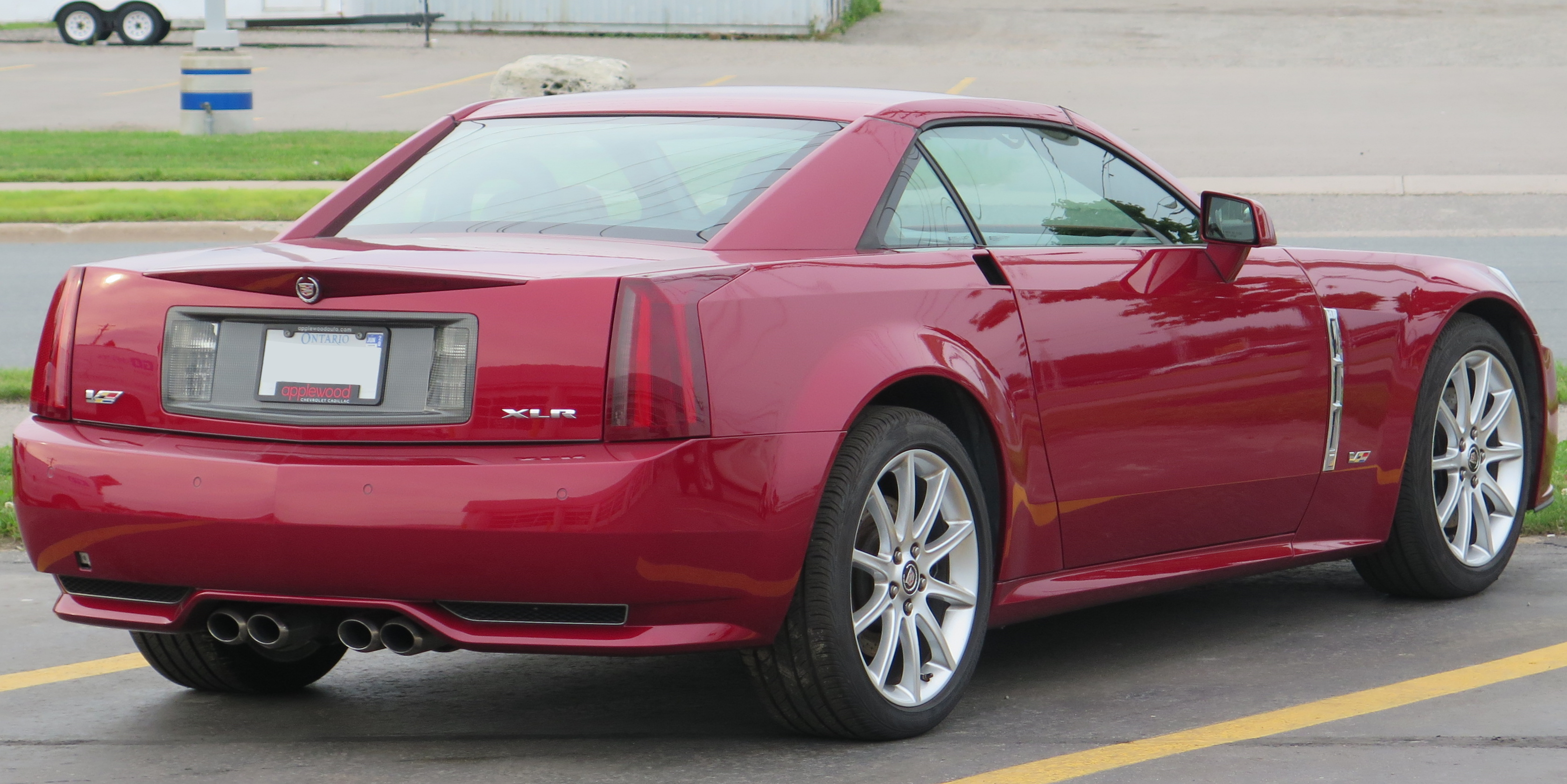
Rear View

== Sales ==
The XLR had sales projections of 5,000 to 7,000 per year. A total of 15,460 were produced over its nine-year model run.

Calendar Year	Total American sales
2003	875
2004	3,665
2005	3,730
2006	3,203
2007	1,750
2008	1,250
2009	787
2010	188
2011	12
Total	15,460

== See also ==
- Cadillac V series
