= Holden Caprice (WM) =

Australian full-size luxury car

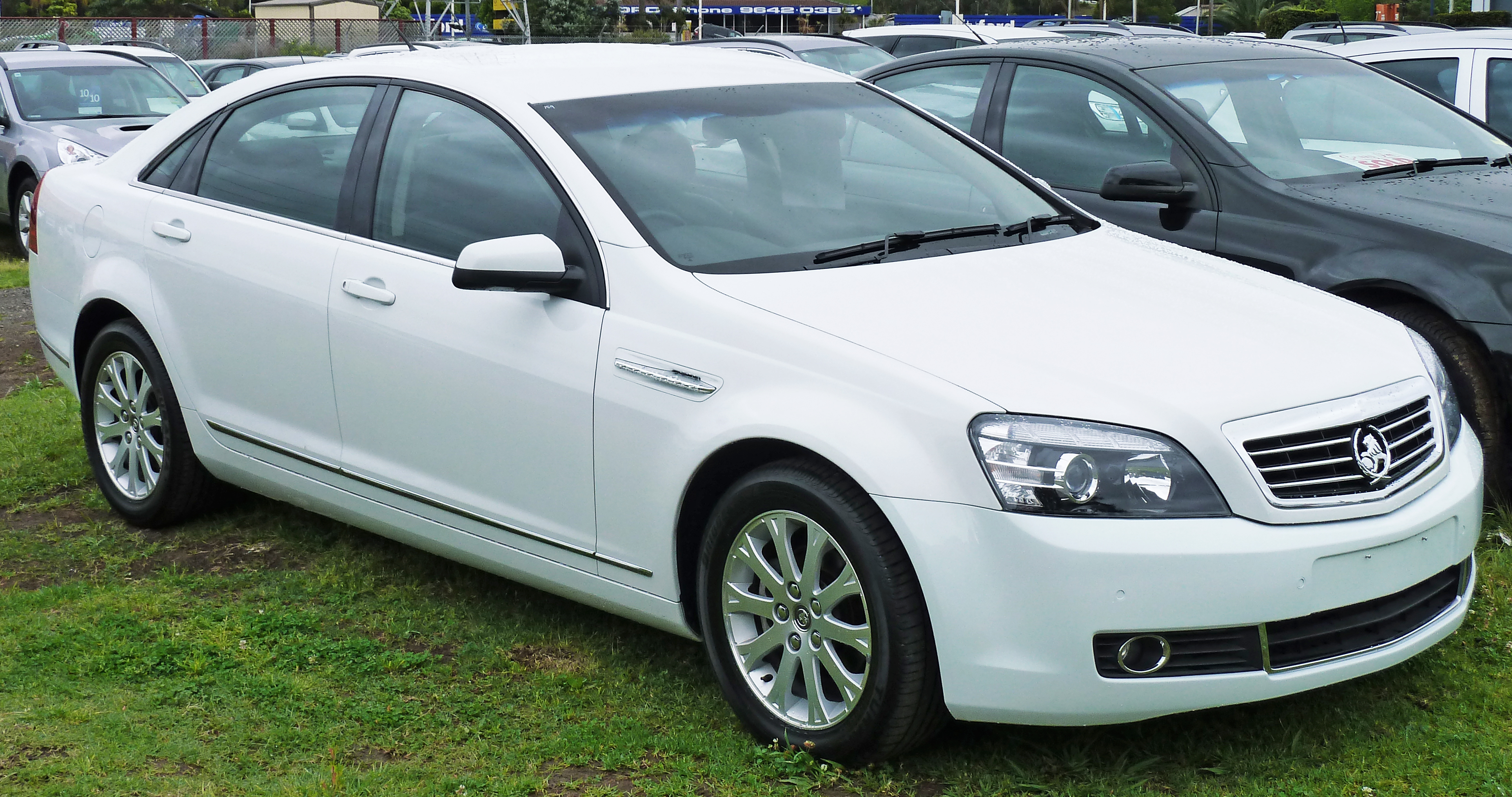
- 2006–2009 Holden Caprice (WM Statesman)

Overview
- Manufacturer: Holden (General Motors)
- Also called: Holden Statesman; HSV Grange; Chevrolet Caprice (U.S. and Middle East); Buick Park Avenue (China); Daewoo Veritas (South Korea); Bitter Vero (Germany)
- Production: August 2006 – October 2017 (Caprice); August 2006 – September 2010 (Statesman)
- Assembly: Australia: Adelaide, South Australia (Elizabeth)
- Designer: Mike Simcoe

Body and chassis
- Class: Full-size luxury car
- Body style: 4-door, 5-seat saloon
- Layout: Front-engine, rear-wheel-drive
- Platform: GM Zeta platform
- Related: Holden Commodore (VE) (WM); Holden Commodore (VF) (WN)

Powertrain
- Engine: 2.8 L LP1 V6 (Buick only); 3.0 L LF1 V6 (Buick only); 3.6 L LY7 V6; 3.6 L LLT V6; 3.6 L LFX V6; 6.0 L L98 V8; 6.0 L L77 V8; 6.0 L LS2 V8 (HSV only); 6.2 L LS3 V8
- Transmission: 5-speed GM 5L40E automatic; 6-speed GM 6L80E automatic

Dimensions
- Wheelbase: 3,009 mm (118.5 in)
- Length: 5,160 mm (203.1 in); 5,175 mm (203.7 in) (Park Avenue)
- Width: 1,899 mm (74.8 in)
- Height: 1,480 mm (58.3 in)
- Kerb weight: 1,885–1,920 kg (4,156–4,233 lb)

Chronology
- Predecessor: Holden Caprice (WL)

The WM and WN series are the third and final generation of the Holden Caprice/Statesman, a range of full-size luxury cars produced by the Australian manufacturer Holden from August 2006 to October 2017, sold primarily in Australia and New Zealand. They were also exported in various guises to the United States, the Middle East, China and South Korea. The range debuted alongside the smaller Holden VE Commodore, which the Caprice shares its Zeta platform with, on 16 July 2006 at the Melbourne Convention and Exhibition Centre.

The WM Caprice and Statesman were an A$190 million investment, in combination with the $1.03 billion VE Commodore programme. The car's main target market was to senior Federal and State politicians, government officials, businesspeople and private buyers in Australia and overseas. In August 2010 the WM Series II was released, and the 'Statesman' variant was discontinued, leaving only the Caprice. The range was updated further to the WN in 2013, followed by the WN Series II in 2015. Holden discontinued production of the Caprice, retired the range and exited the large luxury sedan segment as of October 2017.

== Models and Updates ==
=== WM ===
Starting in 2006, Holden offered the WM series in two trim levels:

- Statesman: Features basic leather seats, woodgrain trim, Blaupunkt base sound system, dual-zone climate control for front passengers, 4-way power adjusting front passenger seat, halogen headlights and 17-inch alloy wheels. Features a slatted front grille and a chrome number plate surround on the rear bumper. Comes standard with the 3.6-litre LY7 V6 engine.
- Caprice: Gains bolstered premium leather seats, rear seat entertainment system with twin LCD screens and DVD player, rear seat tri-zone climate control, brushed aluminium trim, Bose premium sound system, 8-way power adjusting front passenger seat, bi-xenon headlights, headlight washers, heated side mirrors, chrome-accented door handles, 18-inch alloy wheels and sports suspension. Has a different front bumper to the Statesman. Comes standard with the 6.0-litre L98 V8 engine.

Both trims featured common leather-wrapped steering wheels, 8-way power adjusting drivers seats, reversing sensors, built-in fog lights and LED taillights, as well as a Holden-developed MP3/CD/radio infotainment system with a 6.5-inch colour screen, 3.5-mm auxiliary audio input and Bluetooth connectivity for phone calls. Options across the range included a GPS navigation add-on for the infotainment system, sunroof, full-size spare wheel and a limited-slip differential. The available V6 and V8 engines were optional for both trims. Automatic transmission is standard for all WM models, with no manual option available in any configuration.

The WM received upgraded engines in 2009. The Statesman's LY7 V6 was replaced with the new direct-injected LLT V6, while the Caprice received the L77 V8 with GM's Active Fuel Management cylinder deactivation technology. New badges were added to the cars advertising these technologies. The V6 variants also received the same 6L80 6-speed transmission as the V8, replacing the older 5-speed unit.

The front windscreen and the front doors are the only parts of the Caprice that are visually the same as the related VE Holden Commodore. Unlike previous Caprice models, the rear doors were not taken from the Commodore wagon; the WM has its own elongated rear door designs that enable easier entry and egress.

Compared to the previous generation, more sporting trim highlights are used in the cabin and the centre dash incorporates real aluminium. The already considerable rear leg-room has been increased over previous models. Holden's tri-zone climate control system was carried over from the WL Caprice, allowing regulation of the car's temperature at three separate places inside the cabin. Themes for the specialist interior design team were comfort, sophistication, harmony, luxury and attention to detail. The extroverted instrument pad features a wide binnacle, unique chrome-ringed instrument cluster and integrated centre stack with a high-resolution colour screen, zoned audio and climate controls and satin chrome detailing.

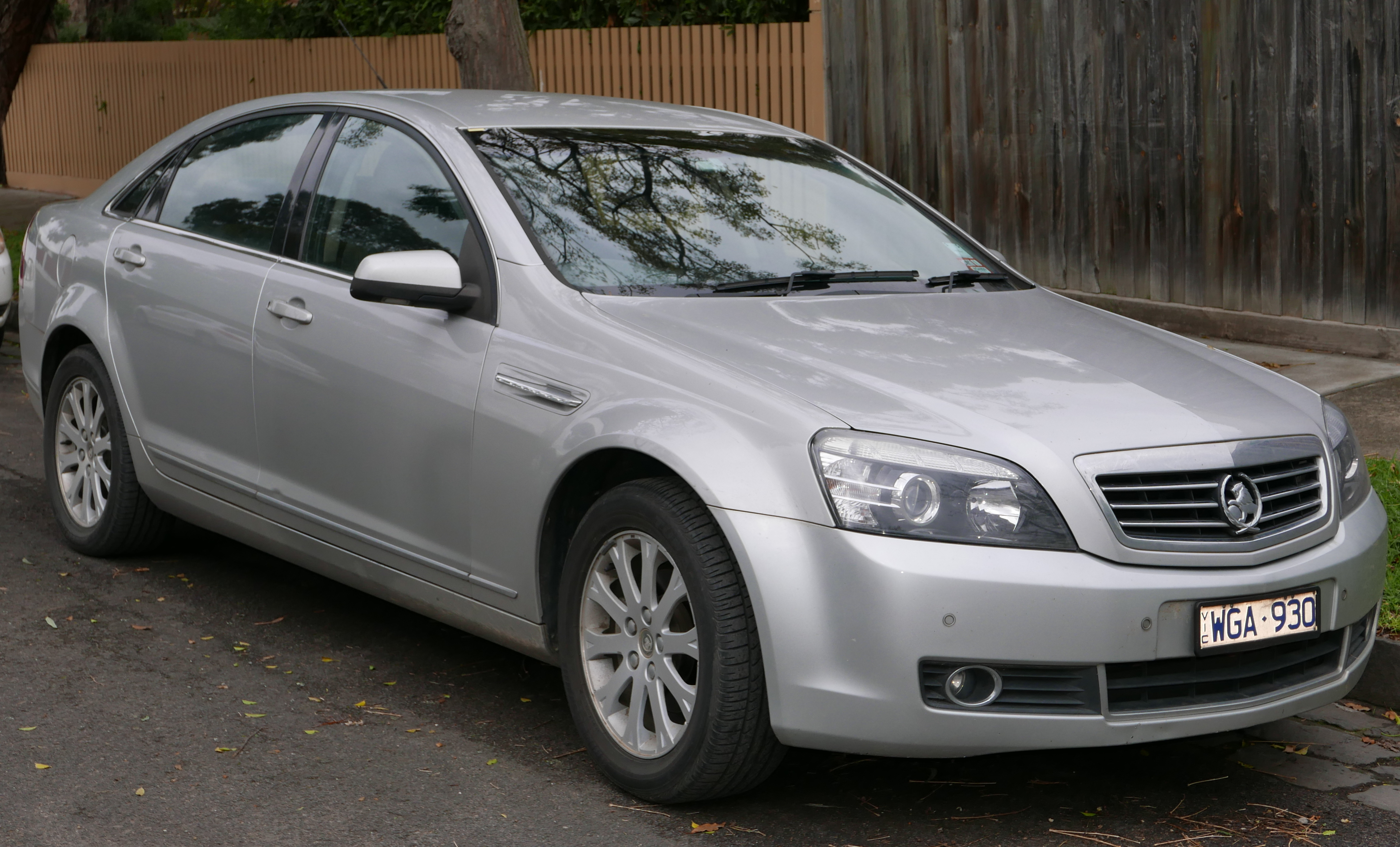
Holden Statesman

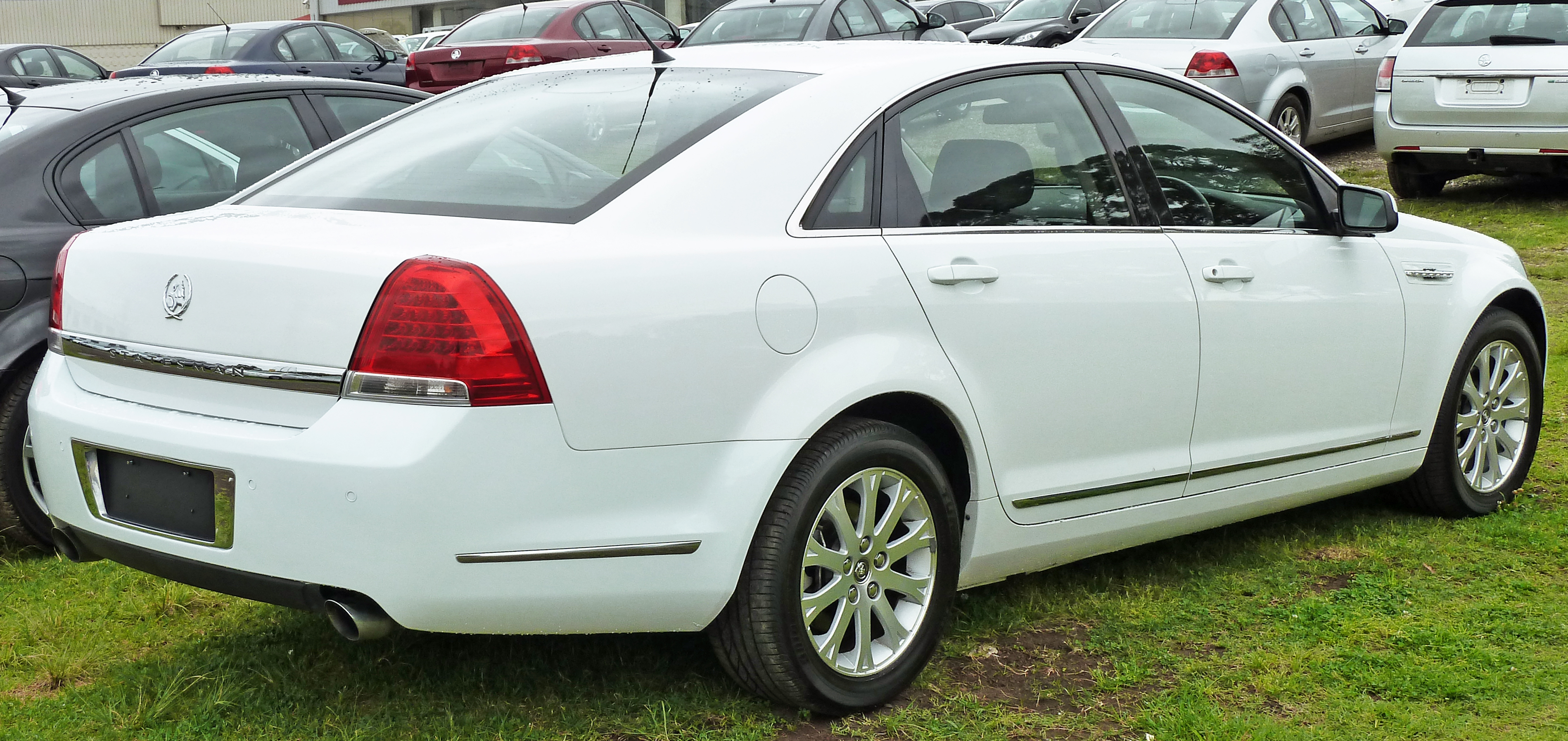
Holden Statesman

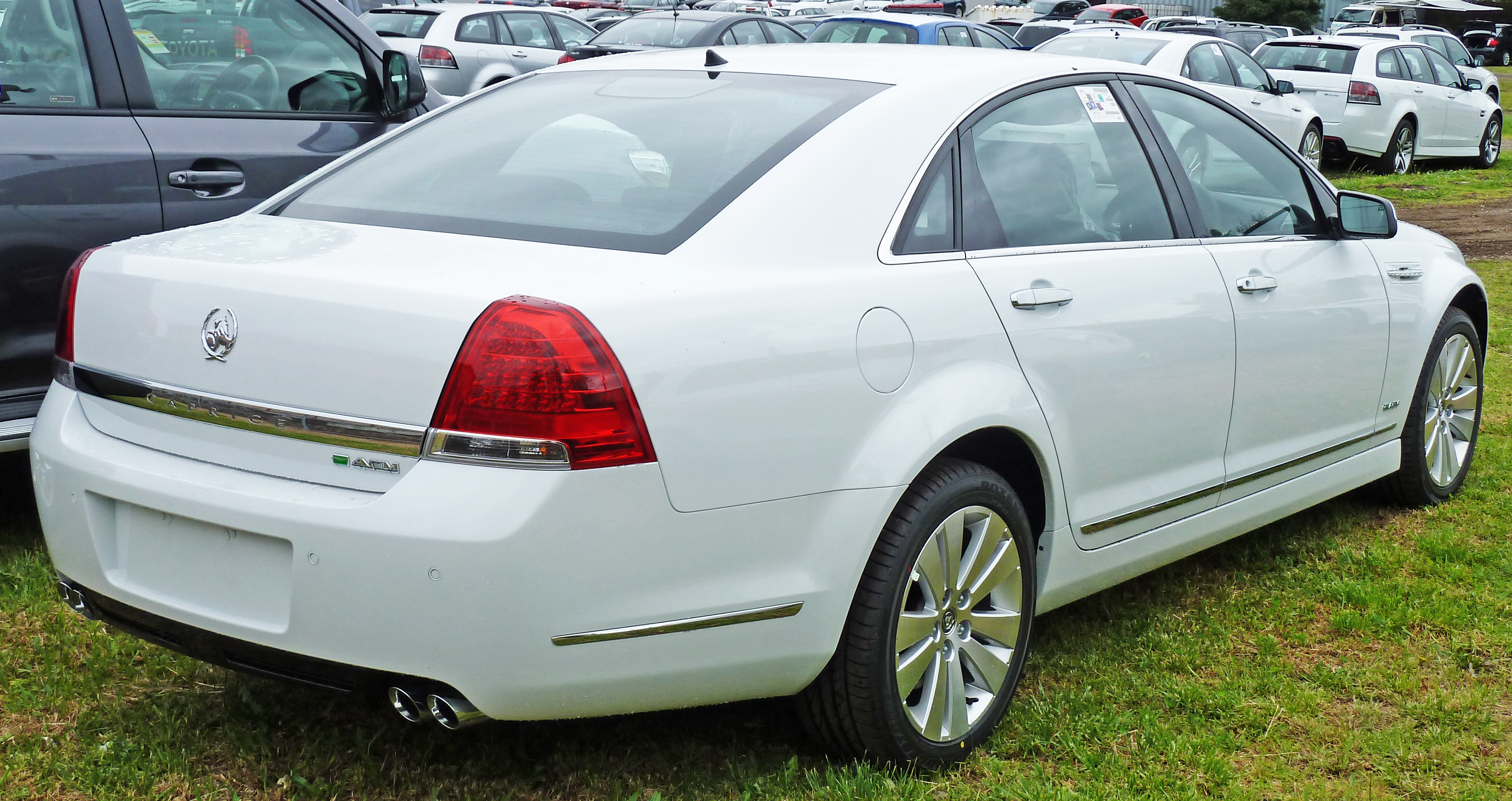
Holden Caprice

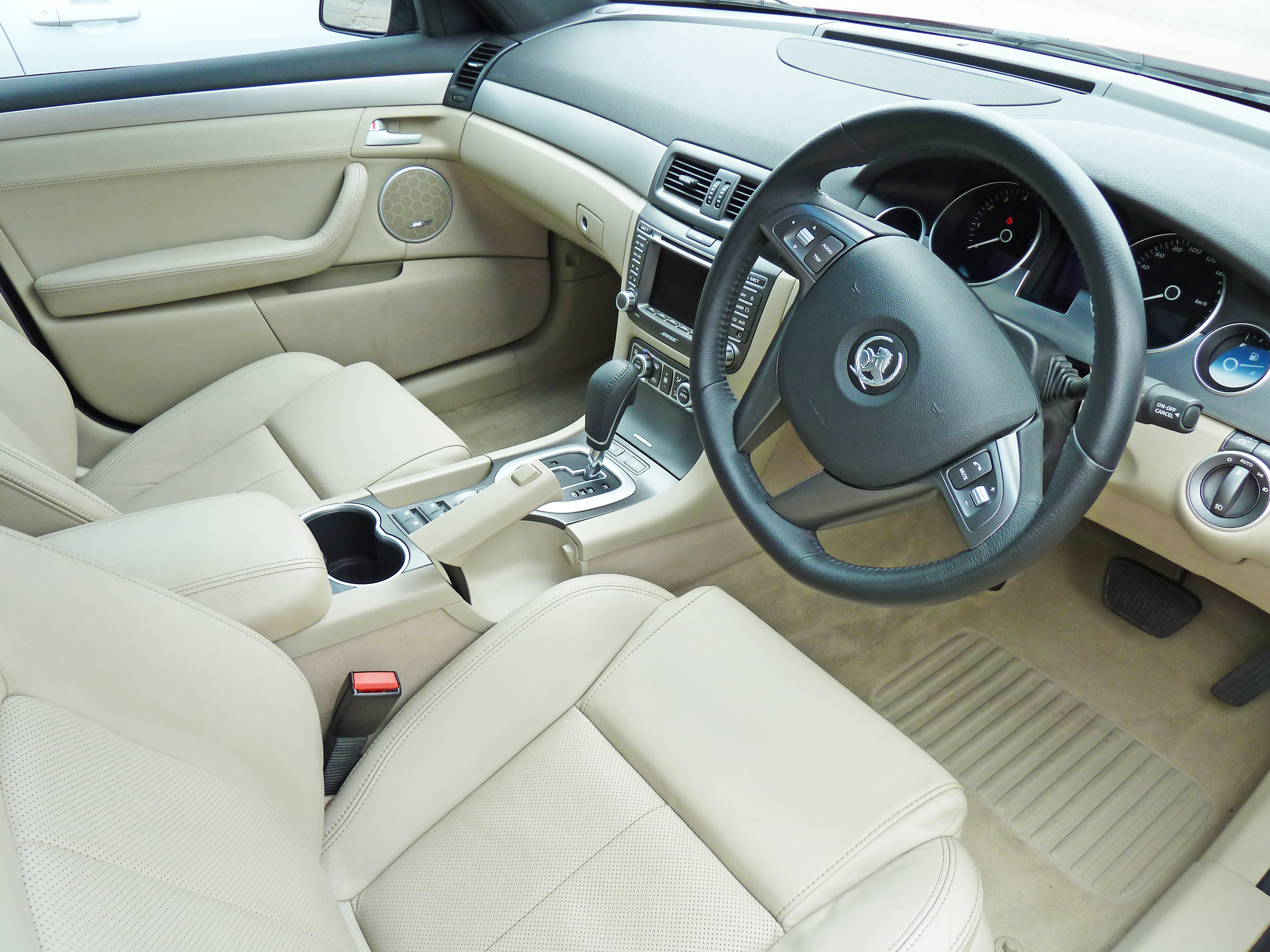
Holden Caprice Interior

=== WM Series II ===
The WM was updated to a Series II designation in mid-2010. The 'Statesman' nameplate and trim was discontinued, including its unique wheels, front and rear styling and woodgrain interior trim. To replace it, the remaining Caprice was split into two trim levels - a decontented base Caprice intended to replace the Statesman in both price and equipment, and a new flagship Caprice 'V' series. The Caprice V gained its own alloy wheel design, standard sunroof and rear seat entertainment system over the base Caprice, making it roughly equivalent to the original WM Series 1 Caprice in equipment. Drivetrain options were also standardised; the Caprice came standard with the 3.6L V6 with an optional LPG variant, while the 6.0L V8 became the sole engine choice on the Caprice V.

The WM2 Caprice was largely unchanged in general interior design from the WM1, but gained Holden's new 'iQ' infotainment system, enabling the connection of USB devices, enhanced bluetooth connectivity for music streaming, satellite navigation with traffic alerts and a reversing camera. The exterior remained similarly unchanged, except for new wheel designs and the chrome boot garnish, which was modified to house the reversing camera. The 'Caprice' nameplate was moved from the garnish to a separate badge as a result.

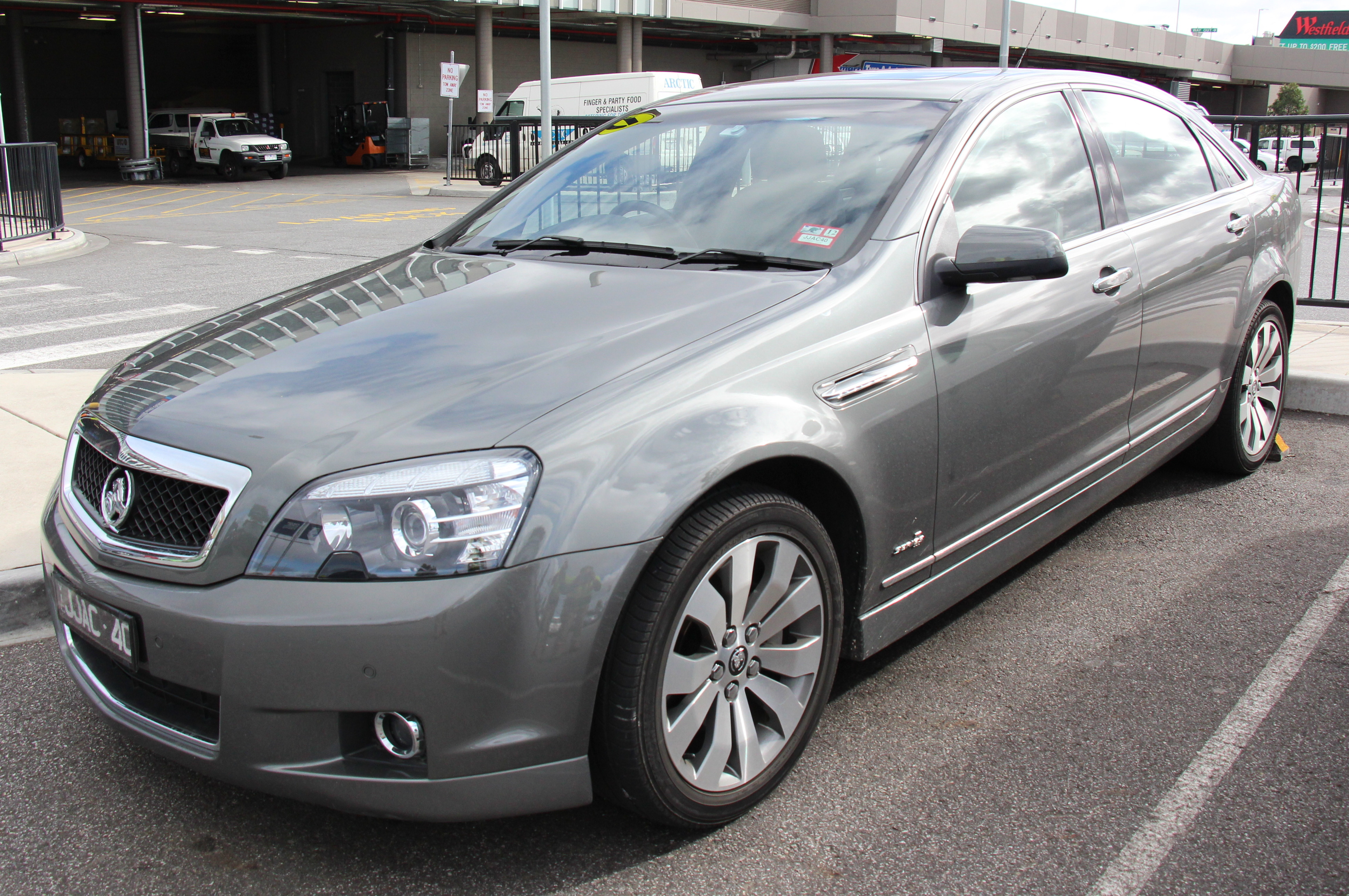
Holden Caprice V (WM II)

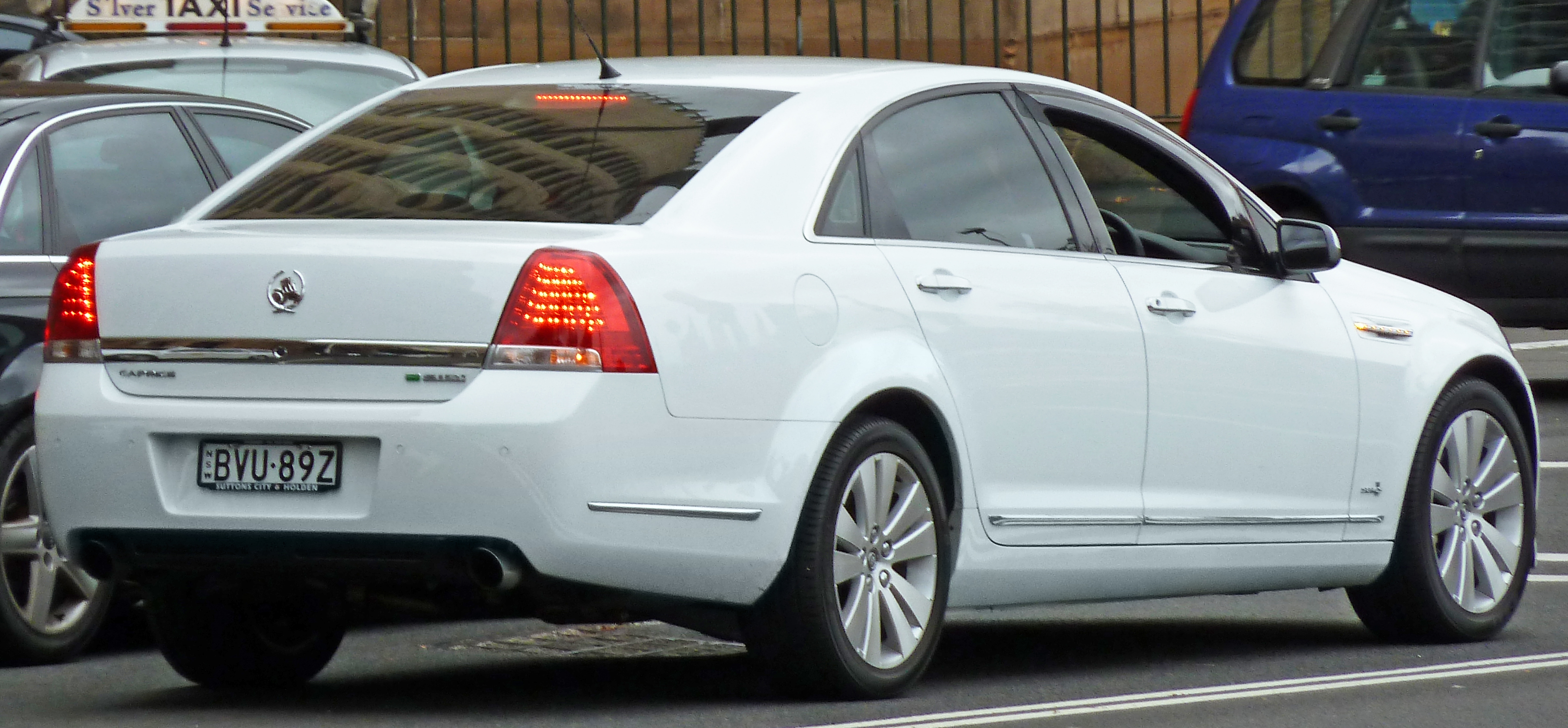
Holden Caprice (WM II)

=== WN ===
The new 'WN' generation Caprice V was released in July 2013.

For the first time, the Caprice no longer had a unique dashboard; instead, the WN gained the same all-new interior, dashboard, sports steering wheel and corporate MyLink infotainment system from the VF generation Holden Calais. The LCD screens for the Caprice V's rear seat entertainment system were redesigned to fold into the seat backs instead of being housed in the front headrests as before and in addition, new auxiliary ports were added for external video devices. Only dual-zone climate control for front passengers is offered on all models; the tri-zone system and rear seat controls from the WM were deleted. The exterior design of the WN Caprice was left almost completely unchanged from the 2006 WM; the only minor visual differences were new, larger 19-inch alloy wheels as standard, a new chromed door handle design and a new rear antenna assembly.

Various new safety and convenience technologies were implemented, including trailer stability control, rear cross traffic alert, backup camera, blind spot monitor, lane departure warning system, forward collision alert, HUD (head-up display), electric park brake, electric-assisted steering, automatic parking and keyless entry and ignition. The previously optional limited-slip differential became standard across all WN "V" models.

The flagship Caprice V was offered in two engine choices. The standard option was the carryover 6.0L V8 from WM series 1 and 2, and an optional LPG 3.6L V6 that was only available for one year from 2014 to 2015. The decontented, base trim, non-V Caprice came only with the LPG 3.6L V6, and was primarily aimed at fleets. It came with the older 18-inch alloy wheels from the WM2 Caprice V, featured a non-sport steering wheel, leather seating and a standard sound system, and deleted the optional rear seat entertainment system, heated seats, HUD, memory seats, lane departure warning, forward collision alert and electric passenger seat adjustment. In 2015, Holden discontinued the base Caprice with no replacement, and the LPG V6 was removed from the entire lineup as a result.

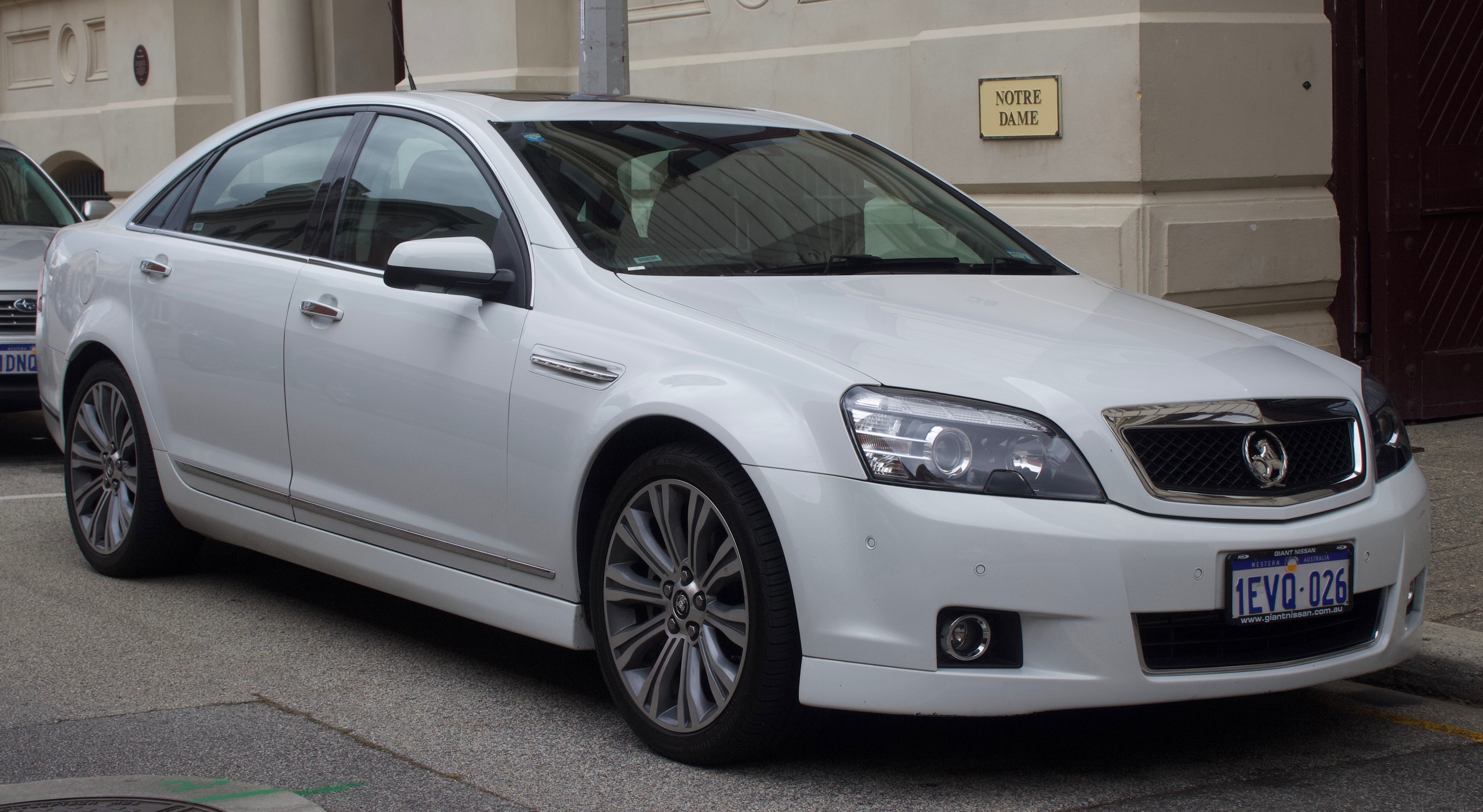
Caprice V (WN)

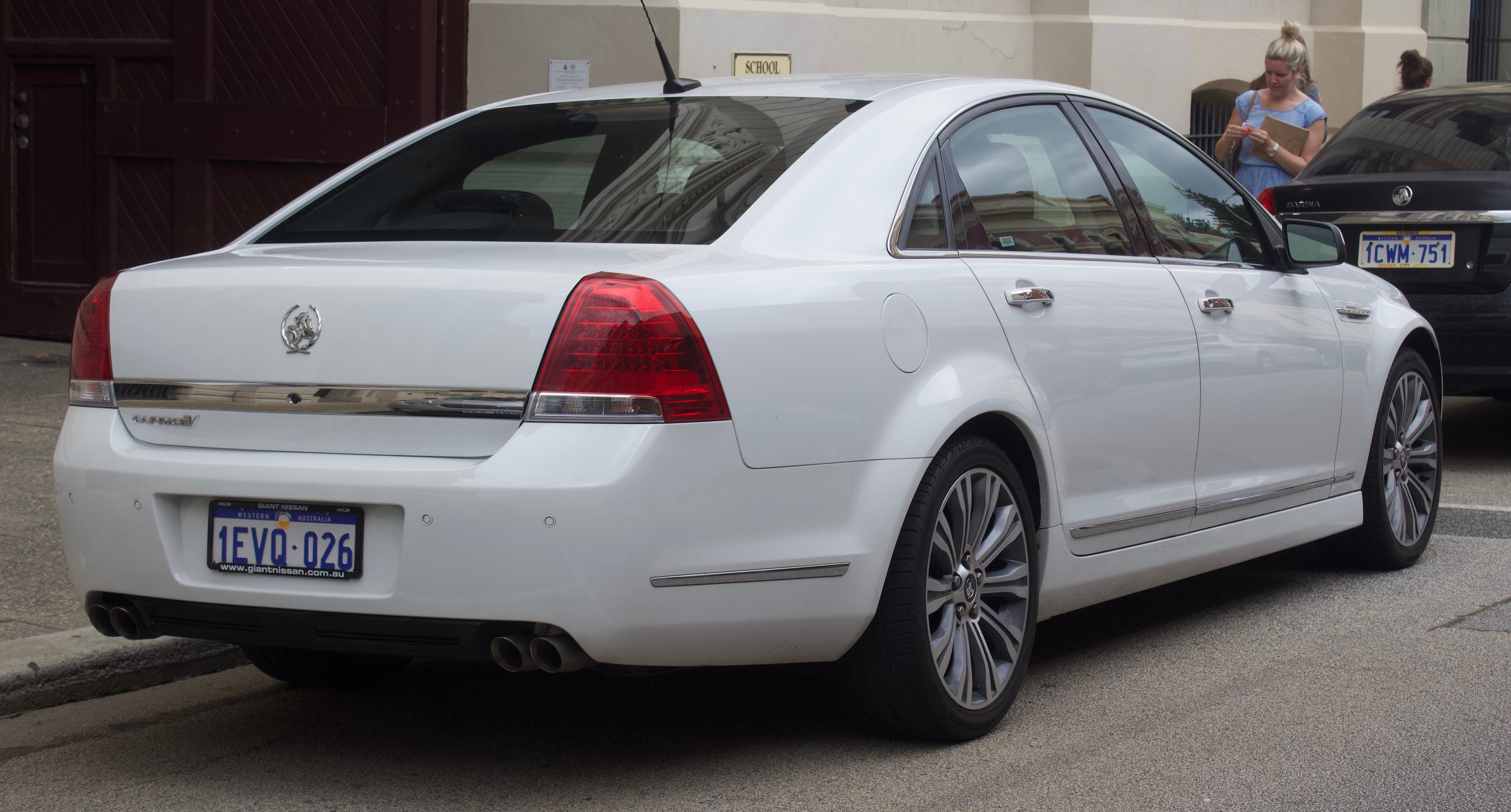
Caprice V (WN)

=== WN Series II ===
The final series II revision of the WN Caprice was released in September 2015. The range was streamlined further with the deletion of the 3.6L LPG V6, leaving only a single trim level with a single V8 drivetrain. The 6.0L L77 V8 engine was replaced with the 6.2L LS3 V8 from the HSV Grange, albeit detuned to 304 kW (408 hp). Cosmetic exterior changes included a new 19-inch alloy wheel design, a rear lip spoiler as standard, and dual exhaust tips replacing the quad exhaust tips of previous V8 models. The interior was mostly unchanged, bar the deletion of the rear seat cupholders and the 3.5 mm auxiliary audio input jack.

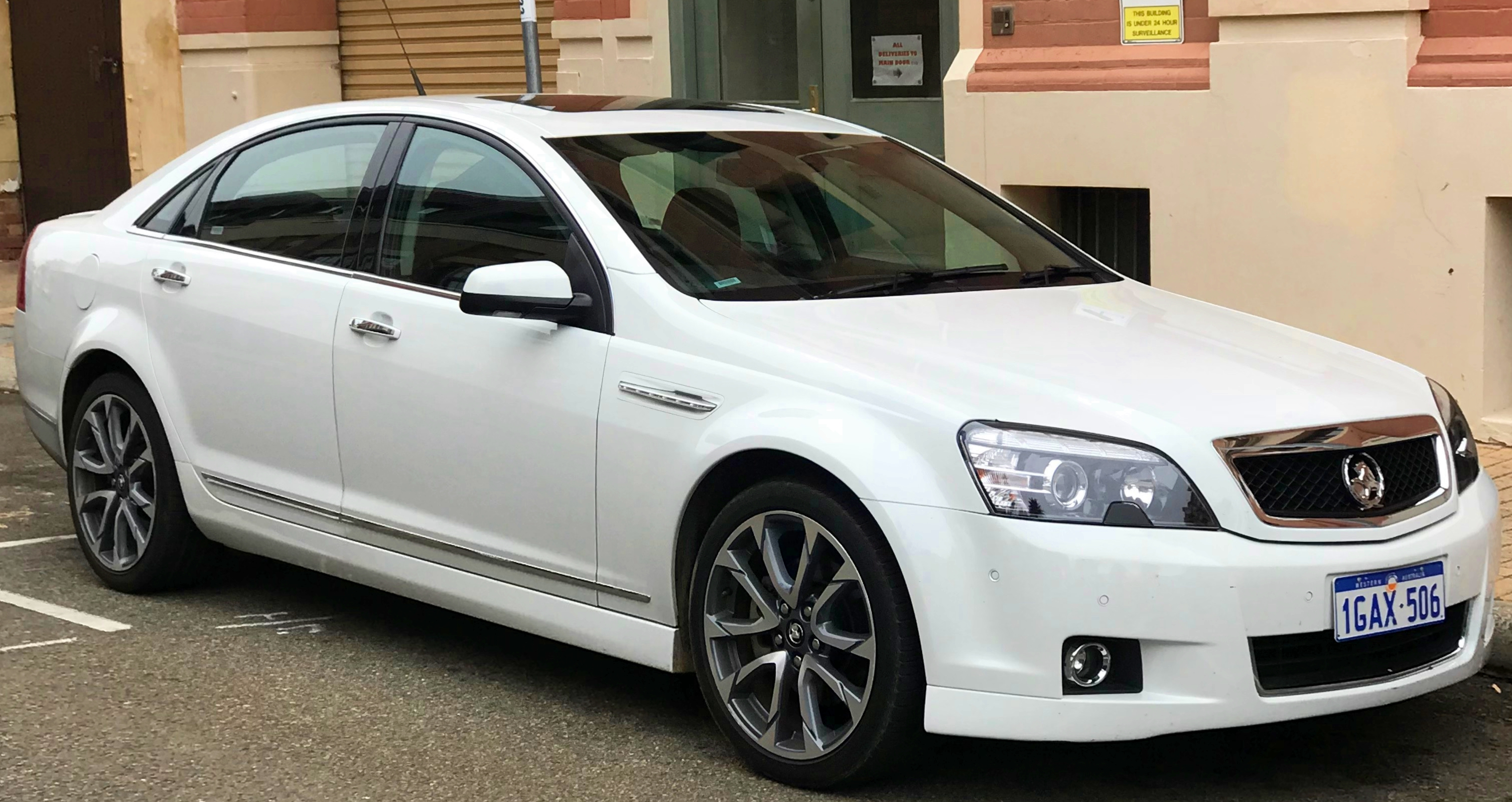
WN II Caprice V

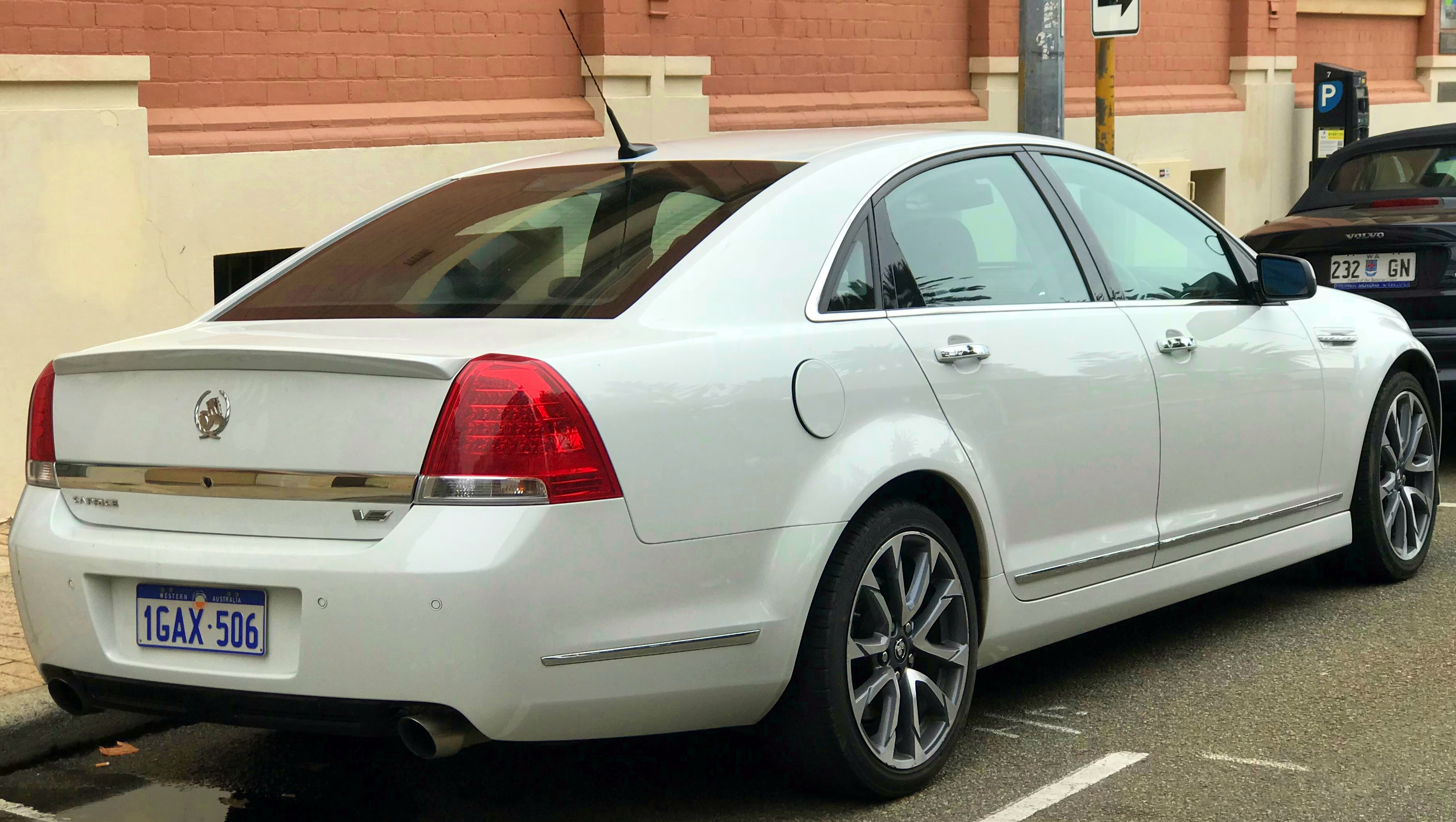
WN II Caprice V

== Drivetrain ==
The WM Caprice originally came standard with the 6.0-litre L98 V8 engine, producing 270 kW (360 hp) coupled to the GM 6L80E six-speed automatic transmission as featured on sports Commodore variants. A 195 kW (261 hp), 3.6-litre Alloytec V6 was also standard on the Statesman, and optional for the Caprice. The semi-sports suspension was stiffened compared to the Statesman, sitting halfway between their standard suspension tune and the "FE2" suspension tune of their sports models. The L98 V8 had a claimed 0 to 100 km/h (0 to 62 mph) time of a little over six seconds.

For the WM MY09.5 update, the L98 was superseded with the newer L77 V8, matched to a six-speed automatic transmission with Active Select. Although less powerful than the L98 at 260 kW (349 hp), the L77 introduced Active Fuel Management (AFM) cylinder deactivation technology, and also offered the ability to run on bio-ethanol or E85 fuels. The WM series 2 update also received Holden's new 210 kW (282 hp) 3.6-litre SIDI direct injection V6, paired to the same automatic transmission. In 2012 the option for an LPG engine was introduced. It was based on vapor injection technology rather liquid injection offered by competitors. The engine offered 180kW and 320Nm and was paired to the same six speed automatic as the rest of the engine lineup.

For the final WN series 2 update, the long-running L77 V8 was superseded by the 6.2 litre LS3 V8, producing 304 kW (408 hp) of power.

Eng. disp.; configuration	Engine	Power	Torque	Transmission	Fuel type	Fuel consumption	Production
3.6 L (3,564 cc); V6	High Output Alloytec (LY7)	195 kW (261 hp; 265 PS)	340 N⋅m (251 lb⋅ft)	5-speed GM 5L40-E automatic	Petrol	11.7 L/100 km (20.1 mpg_{‑US})	2006–2009
3.6 L (3,564 cc); V6	SIDI (LLT)	210 kW (282 hp; 286 PS)	350 N⋅m (258 lb⋅ft)	6-speed GM 6L50 automatic	Petrol	10.3 L/100 km (22.8 mpg_{‑US})	2009–2012
3.6 L (3,564 cc); V6	SIDI (LFX)	210 kW (282 hp; 286 PS)	350 N⋅m (258 lb⋅ft)	6-speed GM 6L50 automatic	Petrol	9.9 L/100 km (23.8 mpg_{‑US})	2012–2013
3.6 L (3,564 cc); V6	LPG (LWR)	180 kW (241 hp; 245 PS)	320 N⋅m (236 lb⋅ft)	6-speed GM 6L45 automatic	LPG	12.1 L/100 km (19.4 mpg_{‑US})	2012–2015
6.0 L (5,967 cc); V8	Generation 4 Alloy (L98)	270 kW (362 hp; 367 PS)	530 N⋅m (391 lb⋅ft)	6-speed GM 6L80-E automatic	Petrol	14.4 L/100 km (16.3 mpg_{‑US})	2006–2008
6.0 L (5,967 cc); V8	Generation 4 Alloy (L98)	270 kW (362 hp; 367 PS)	530 N⋅m (391 lb⋅ft)	6-speed GM 6L80-E automatic	Petrol	13.0 L/100 km (18.1 mpg_{‑US})	2009-2009
6.0 L (5,967 cc); V8	Generation 4 Alloy (AFM) (L77)	260 kW (349 hp; 354 PS)	517 N⋅m (381 lb⋅ft)	6-speed GM 6L80-E automatic	Petrol	12.6 L/100 km (18.7 mpg_{‑US})	2009–2010
6.0 L (5,967 cc); V8	Generation 4 Alloy (AFM) (L77)	260 kW (349 hp; 354 PS)	517 N⋅m (381 lb⋅ft)	6-speed GM 6L80-E automatic	Petrol	12.3 L/100 km (19.1 mpg_{‑US})	2010–2013
6.0 L (5,967 cc); V8	Generation 4 Alloy (AFM) (L77)	260 kW (349 hp; 354 PS)	517 N⋅m (381 lb⋅ft)	6-speed GM 6L80-E automatic	Petrol	11.7 L/100 km (20.1 mpg_{‑US})	2013-2015
6.2 L (6,162 cc); V8	Generation 4 Alloy (LS3)	304 kW (408 hp; 413 PS)	570 N⋅m (420 lb⋅ft)	6-speed GM 6L80-E automatic	Petrol	12.9 L/100 km (18.2 mpg_{‑US})	2015–2017

== Safety ==
In the safety aspect the Statesman comes with Bosch Electronic Stability Control, traction control, ABS brakes, EBD, BAS and a tyre-pressure monitoring system as standard Front, side and curtain airbags come as standard which is another incentive to improve the Caprice's safety equipment, this also contributed to the fact that the Caprice's safety rating surpass that off its main rival, the LTD. Development commenced with the largest virtual crash modelling program Holden has ever undertaken. Emphasis was placed on considering the range of impact scenarios that occur in real world accident situations and differing occupant criteria. Safety technologies were benchmarked along with the world's leading luxury brands and major engineering programs delivered a stiffer body structure and vastly increased usage of advanced strength steels. Multiple load corridor strategies for frontal, side and rear impacts improve passenger compartment integrity. They are complemented by an improved multi-point airbag sensing system and an adaptive restraint system which includes dual stage front airbags, thorax side impact airbags, curtain airbags and front seat active head restraints as standard equipment. Structurally optimised crush zones absorb crash energy and other occupant protection features include a steering column ride-down mechanism and breakaway brake pedal.

ANCAP test results* Holden Caprice / Statesman (2010)
Test	Score
Overall	5 /5 stars
Frontal offset	13.45/16
Side impact	16/16
Pole	2/2
Seat belt reminders	2/3
Whiplash protection	Not Assessed
Pedestrian protection	Poor
Electronic stability control	Standard

ANCAP test results* Holden Caprice (2013)
Test	Score
Overall	5 /5 stars
Frontal offset	14.06/16
Side impact	16/16
Pole	2/2
Seat belt reminders	3/3
Whiplash protection	Good
Pedestrian protection	Marginal
Electronic stability control	Standard

== HSV Grange ==
The WM Series Grange released in May 2007, with a LS2 at 307 kW (412 hp), later transiting to a 6.2-litre LS3 at 317 kW (425 hp). The WM III Grange released in September 2010, with LS3 at 325 kW (436 hp).

The WN Series Grange released in 2013, with a LS3 at 340 kW (456 hp). The limited production 'Grange SV' released in 2016. The HSV Grange ended production in 2017.

== Exports ==
=== Chevrolet Caprice (Middle East) ===
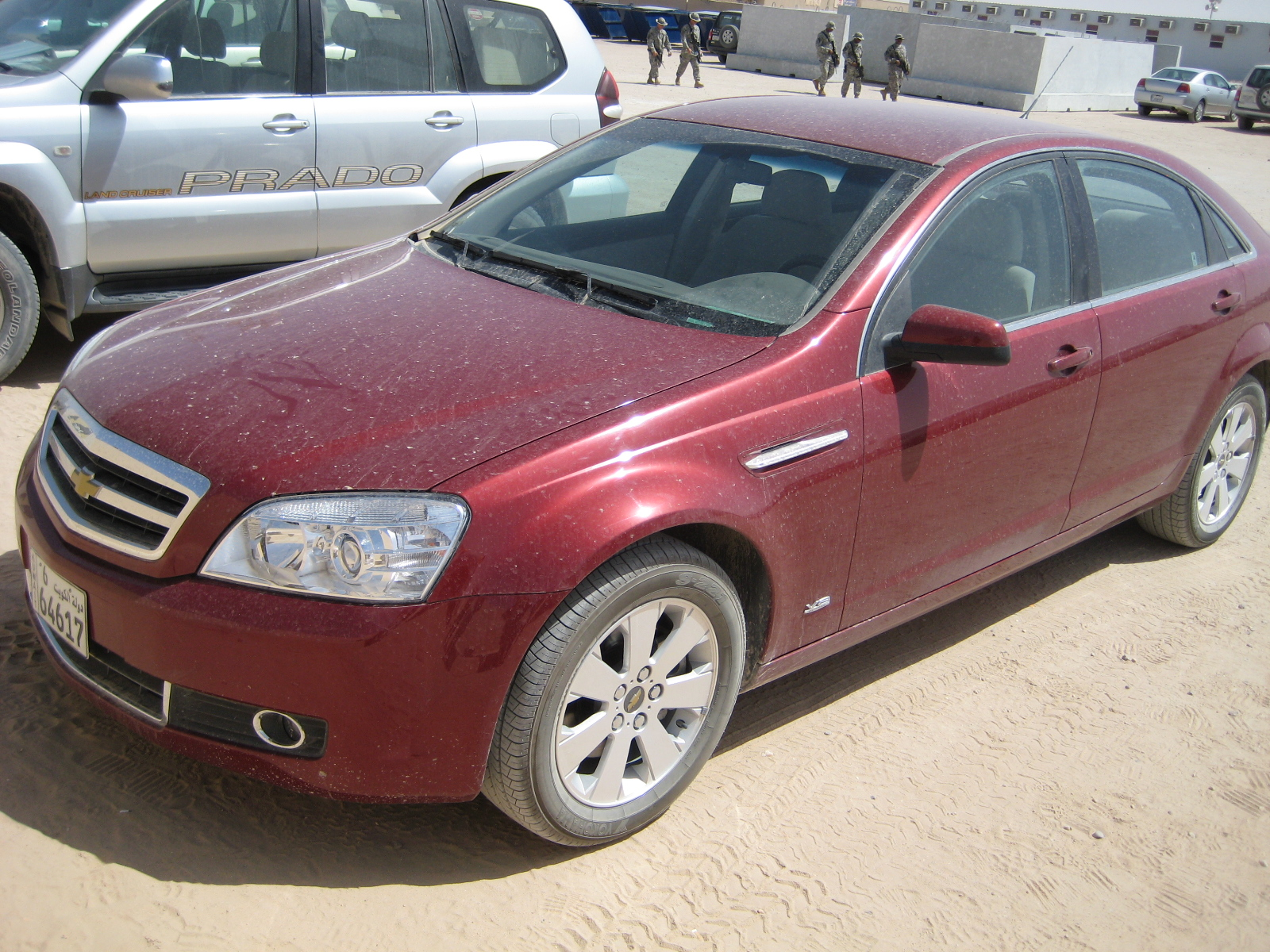
Middle East Caprice

As with previous models, the WM Caprice was exported to Middle East markets (including GCC countries of Kuwait, Qatar, Saudi Arabia, Bahrain, Oman and the UAE) from 2007 to 2017, where it was marketed and sold under the Chevrolet brand. Chevrolet offered four different trim levels for the Caprice, all largely similar to the Australian models with some differences:

- LS: Based largely on the Holden Statesman, but features halogen headlights and taillights, black plastic mirrors and door handles and 17-inch wheels. Front fog lights and chrome highlights on the bodywork are deleted. Interior has cloth seats, plastic steering wheel and the full entry-level VE Commodore Omega dashboard and head unit, with base Blaupunkt sound system.
  - This base model trim was not available in Australia or New Zealand; its role there was fulfilled by the similarly specified VE Commodore Omega.
- LTZ: As LS, but gains fog lights, full Statesman 'Prestige' dashboard and head unit with woodgrain trim and leather-wrapped steering wheel, 18-inch alloy wheels and tri-zone climate control for rear passengers.
- SS: As LTZ, but gains projector headlights and LED taillights, brushed metal dashboard and interior trim, full Holden Caprice front bumper with fog lights, boot lip spoiler and an Impala badge on the bootlid in place of the Chevrolet badge.
- Royale: As LTZ, but gains projector headlights and LED taillights, headlight washers, leather seats with rear seat entertainment system, sunroof, reversing camera and premium Bose sound system. Features a chrome slatted grille and a Chevrolet bonnet ornament unique to this model.

The Middle East-market Caprice was equipped with same engine and powertrain options as available in Australia, although the 3.6L V6 engine was removed from the lineup for the WM Series II update in 2011. The Caprice received all subsequent updates (WN and WN Series II) through to the end of Australian production. The Middle East region comprised the majority of Caprice exports outside of Australia.

=== Chevrolet Caprice PPV (United States) ===
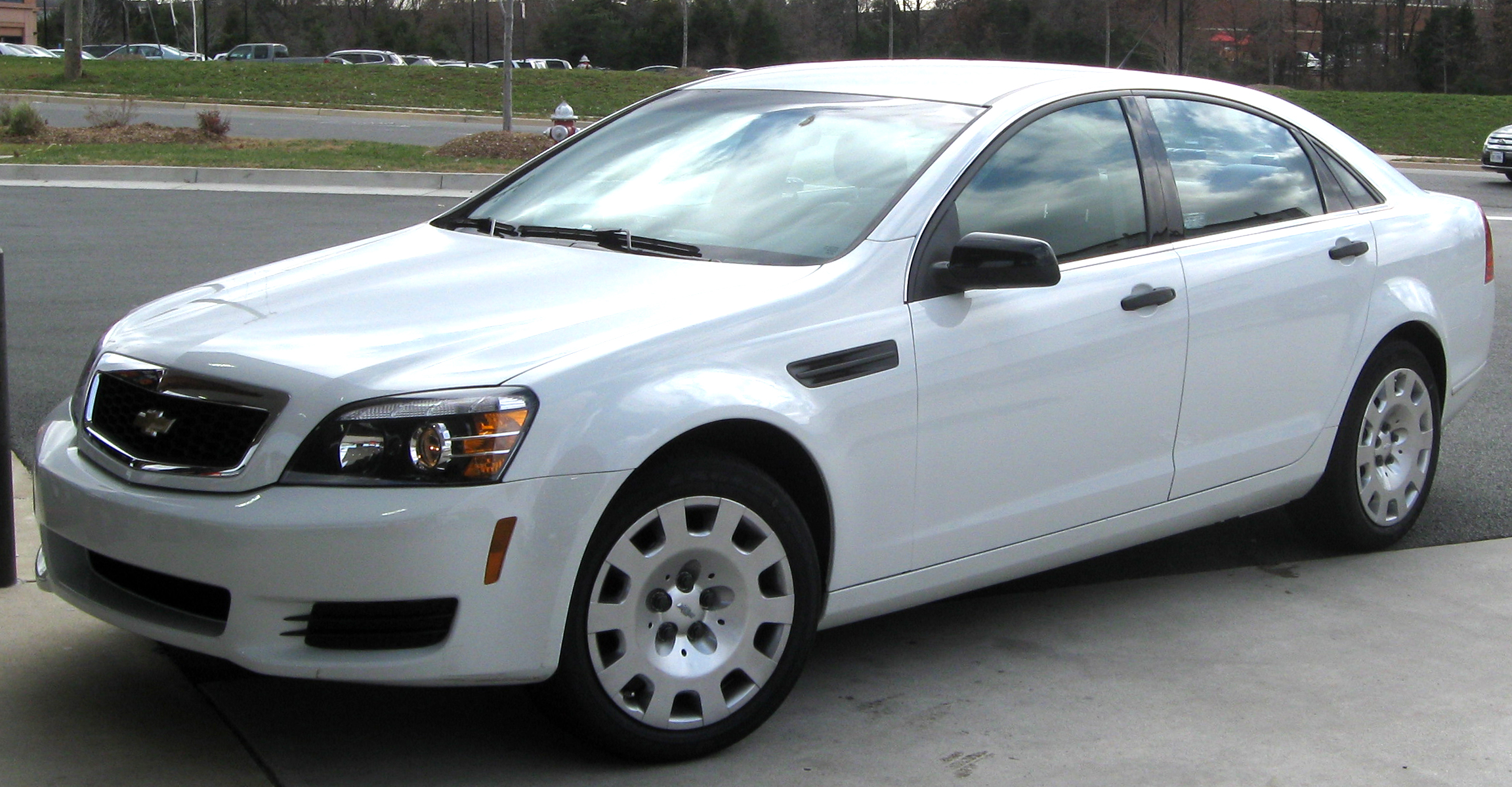
Chevrolet Caprice PPV

The WM and WN Caprices were exported to the United States as the Chevrolet Caprice PPV (Police Patrol Vehicle) from 2011 to 2017. Unlike past US-market Caprices, the imported Caprice PPV was strictly police-only, and not offered by Chevrolet or otherwise legally available to the public as a new, untitled vehicle. The PPV was initially available in two specification levels, both significantly decontented and downmarket compared to the Australian models:

- PPV 9C3 (Detective): As per the Middle Eastern 'LS' base model, but with 18-inch steel wheels, amber front indicators, black plastic guard vents, black plastic interior door handles and seat-mounted seatbelts. The glovebox lock, rear seat map pockets and folding middle rear seat were all deleted, and the iQ infotainment system was locked down to AM/FM radio operation only. The unique front bumper was based on the VE2 Commodore Omega. The rear bumper also deleted the chrome trims and the diffuser.
  - The 9C3 was discontinued after the 2013 model year as part of the WN update.
- PPV 9C1 (Patrol): As per the 9C3, but the centre console and armrest were deleted and replaced with a large police accessory mounting bracket. As a result, the power window switches were relocated to the front doors, the handbrake was replaced with a foot brake, and the automatic shifter was moved closer to the driver. GM's Tap Shift feature was deleted from the automatic shifter, instead featuring a selectable Pursuit Mode, which raised the up- and down-shift points, sacrificing fuel economy for more aggressive throttle and transmission response when necessary. 9C1s feature vinyl flooring instead of carpeting standard.
  - 2014+ WN versions of the 9C1 gained the brand new dashboard and infotainment system from the WN Holden Caprice. The floor shifter was deleted entirely and replaced with a unique column shifter, freeing up maximum space in the centre mounting rack for police equipment. The WN PPV also continued to use a traditional ignition key barrel, in place of the Holden version's new keyless ignition button.

The standard engine across the PPV range was the 6.0L L77 petrol V8; the 6.2L LS3 V8 from later Holden versions was never offered. The 3.6-litre LFX V6 petrol engine became available as an option from 2012 onwards. The car enjoyed a positive reception in the US, with near perfect scores in an assessment by the Los Angeles County Sheriff's Department, and the only criticism being directed at over-cautious electronic stability control.

The Caprice PPV was updated to the new WN generation in 2014, now only available in the 9C1 trim level. In 2015, the PPV gained the reversing camera from the Holden Caprice. The car's final update for 2017 made standard a limited-slip differential with the V6, a vinyl rear bench seat with seat-back security panel, and an 18-inch full size spare wheel.

=== Buick Park Avenue (China) ===
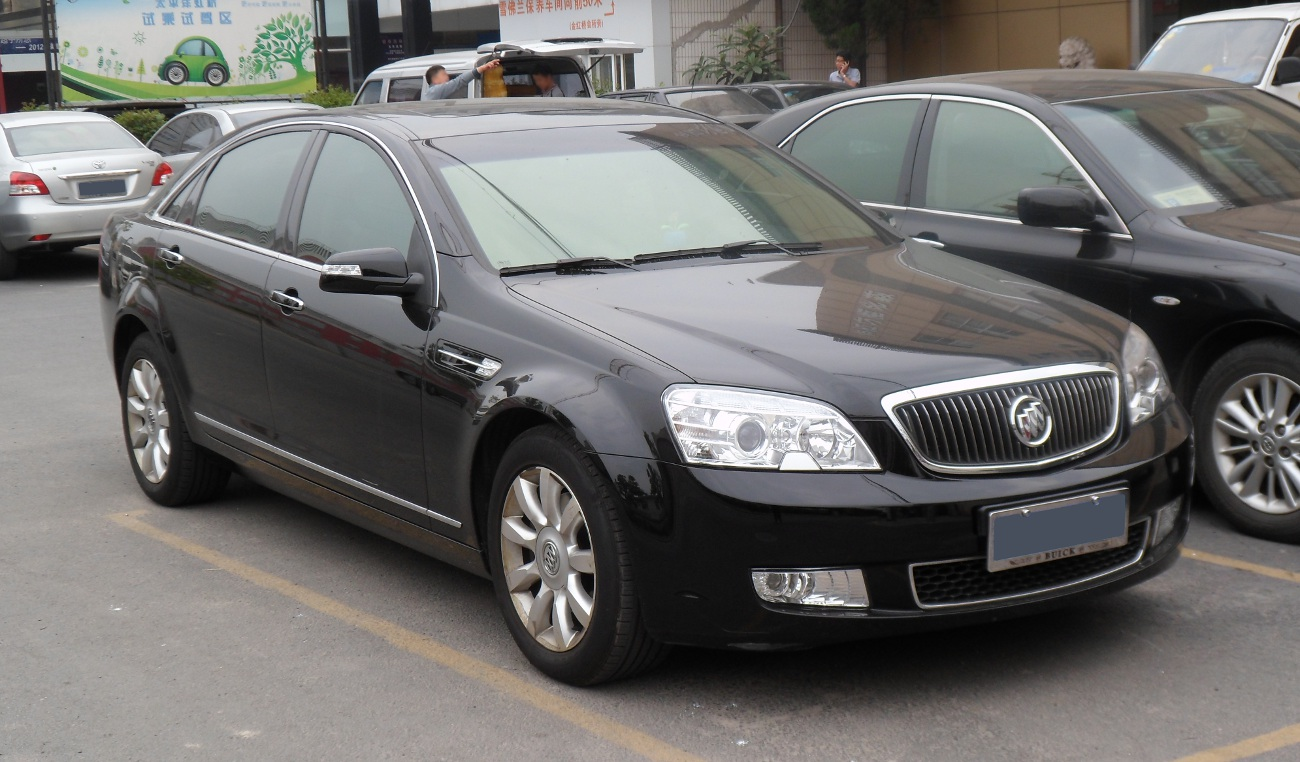
Buick Park Avenue in Shanghai

The third-generation Buick Park Avenue was introduced in April 2007 for the Chinese market, based on the WM Caprice. It replaced the WL Caprice-based Buick Royaum. It is the only version of the Caprice that was not fully built in Australia by Holden; complete knock down kits were exported by Holden to China for local assembly by SAIC-GM.

It was positioned as Buick's largest flagship luxury car, and was available in four trim levels: Flagship (旗舰型), Luxury (豪华型), Elite (精英型), Comfort (舒适型).

The Park Avenue shares a similar basic specification to the WM Caprice, but the local Chinese assembly allowed for more changes to be made. The interior gained an all-new Buick-designed dashboard with a new infotainment system, analog clock and woodgrain trim with chrome highlights. Heated front seats were added with rotating headrests, a closing lid was added to the centre cupholders and the electric window and mirror switches were relocated to the doors. The interior doors were redesigned to accommodate new air conditioning vents, a different, chromed and backlit handle design and expandable map pockets. An electric handbrake replaced the lever brake, and remote start functionality was added.

The back of the car featured the biggest change; a modified rear floor to accommodate electrically adjustable rear seats, with heating, ventilation and massage functions, and a large, folding middle seat centre console with seating controls and cupholders. A single roof-mounted DVD screen was fitted ahead of the DVD player for rear seat entertainment. The Park Avenue also added rear sunvisors, a passenger-side seat-mounted fold-down table, auxiliary AV ports and built-in window sunshades. Cigarette lighters and ashtrays were added as standard on all models in the front and back of the car. The tri-zone air conditioning controls were relocated from the roof to the centre armrest. A premium Harman Kardon sound system replaced the Bose and Blaupunkt systems used in other Caprice variants.

Exterior changes included new alloy wheel designs, a Buick 'waterfall' chrome front grille, different guard indicators, a new front bumper design and a large 'Buick' chrome garnish on the bootlid. The 'bee-sting' wire antenna on the roof was also replaced with a smaller 'shark-fin' antenna. Initially, the Park Avenue was available with the Caprice's 3.6-litre LY7 petrol V6 engine, as well as an additional 2.8-litre LP1 V6 on lower spec models, which was exclusive to the Park Avenue. The range was streamlined to a single drivetrain, the 3.0-litre LF1 V6 in 2010, which was also used in the Australian VE series II Commodore Omega. No V8 options were available.

Buick discontinued production of the Park Avenue in October 2012, with no WN update and no direct replacement model.

=== Daewoo Veritas (South Korea) ===
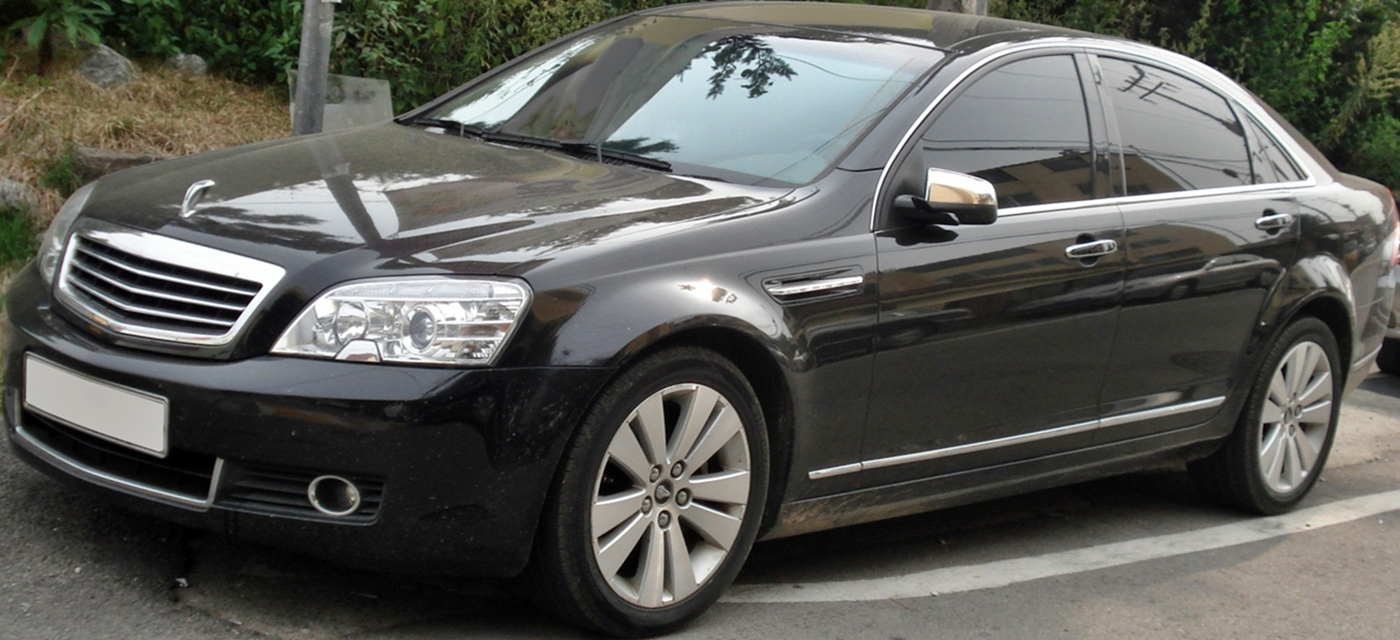
Daewoo Veritas (South Korea)

The Daewoo Veritas (Korean: GM대우 베리타스) was introduced in South Korea in 2008, after showcasing a pre-production Daewoo L4X concept in 2007. The Veritas is very close in specification to the Middle Eastern Chevrolet Caprice Royale, with a similar plain slatted grille and Daewoo hood ornament. However, in the back, the Veritas shares the Buick Park Avenue's electrically adjustable, heated and massaging back seats, along with the same flip-down centre console with seat controls, and the same single roof-mounted DVD screen fitted for rear seat entertainment. The Veritas gained its own unique features not used on other Caprices, including an internal air purifier system, power-folding side mirrors and an extra bank of navigation and infotainment controls located near the shifter. The sole powertrain on offer was the 3.6-litre LFX V6, later upgraded to the direct injection LLT version in 2010.

The Veritas was discontinued in 2011, when the Daewoo brand was shuttered in Korea.

=== Bitter Vero (Germany) ===
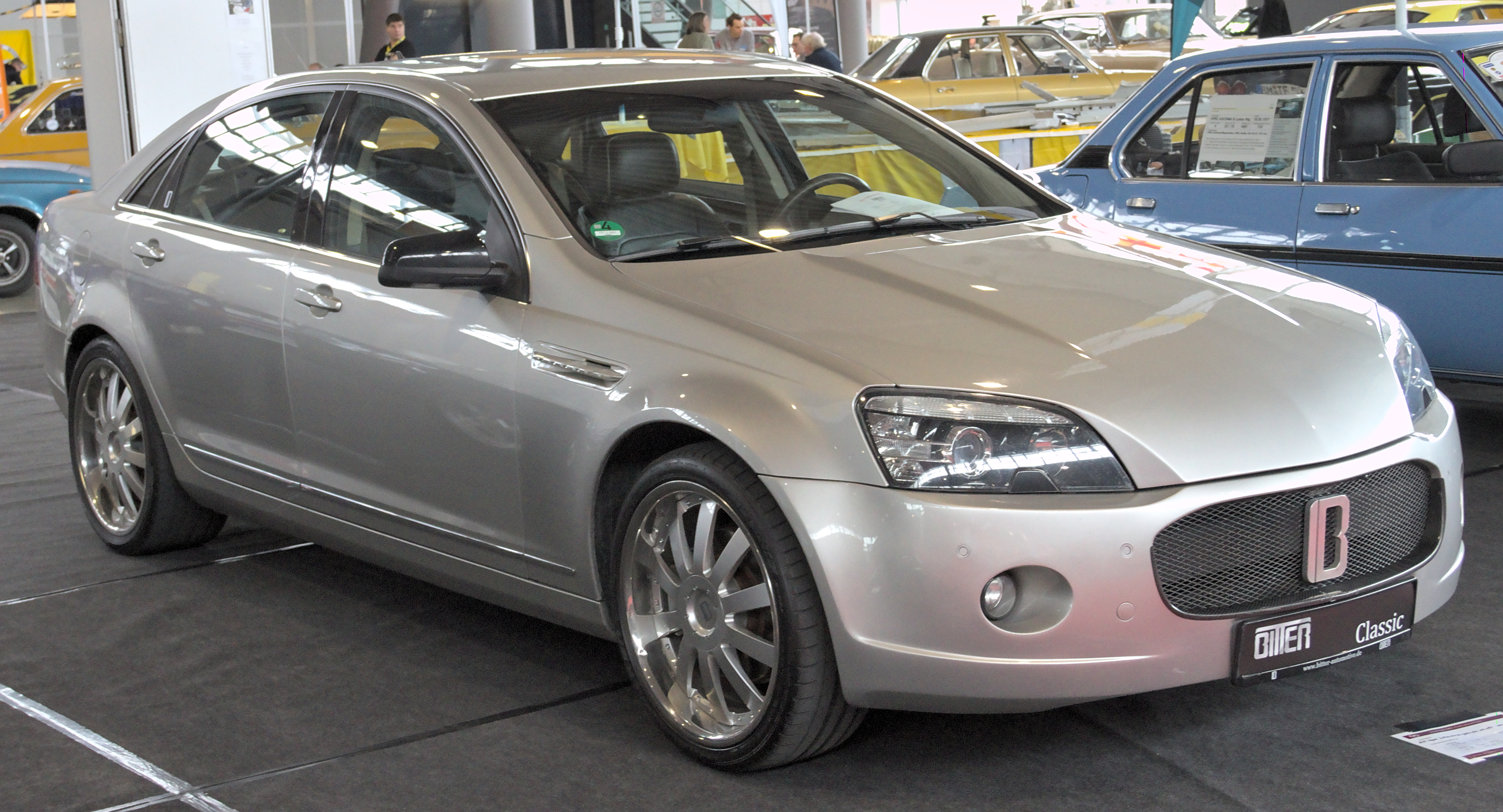
2011 Bitter Vero

In 2008, the small-scale German manufacturer Bitter launched the Vero, an imported, modified WM Caprice, after first showcasing it at the Geneva Motor Show. The Vero came standard with the 6.0L L98 V8 engine and was presented as a boutique luxury car. It featured a host of cosmetic changes, such as a unique brown leather interior and dashboard trim, heated front seats, B-shaped exhaust tips, new alloy wheels and a new front bumper & grille, with a droopsnoot bonnet treatment.

Only ten units were built; all were purchased and imported directly from Holden, via Erich Bitter's friendship with Holden's former managing director, Peter Hanenberger. The Vero was sold in Germany for €121,975 and was discontinued in 2012.

== See also ==
- HSV Grange
