= GM 6L transmission =

6-speed automatic from 2005

6L 45 · 6L 50 · 6L 80 · 6L 90
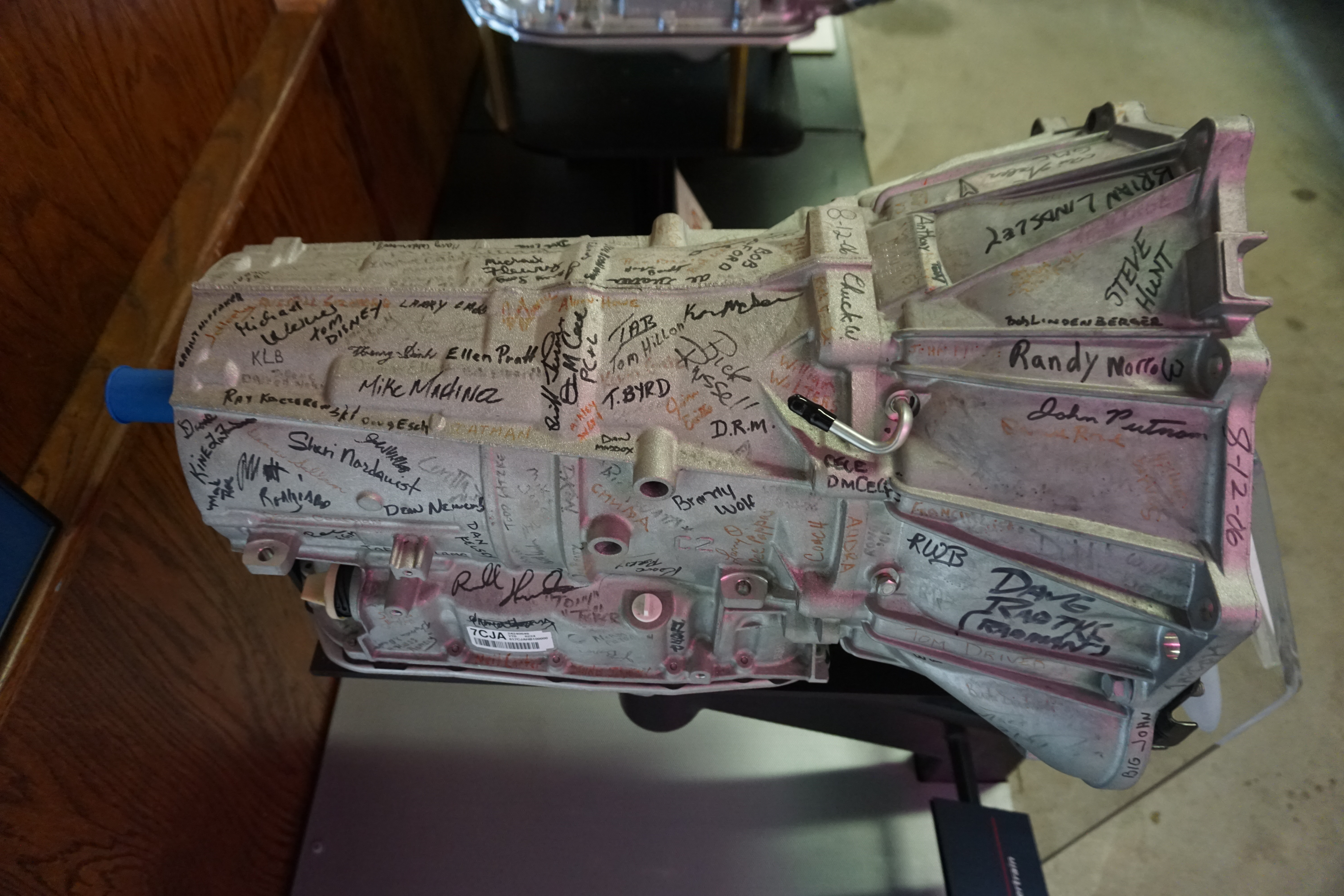
- A Hydra-Matic 6L 80 transmission at the Ypsilanti Automotive Heritage Museum

Overview
- Manufacturer: General Motors
- Production: 2005–2023

Body and chassis
- Class: 6-Speed longitudinal automatic transmission
- Related: Lepelletier planetary gearset Aisin AWTF-80 SC; Ford 6R; ZF 6HP

Chronology
- Predecessor: 5L 40-E · 5L 50
- Successor: 8L 45 · 8L 90

The 6L family is a series of 6-speed automatic transmissions produced by General Motors for longitudinal engines. It uses a Lepelletier planetary gearset, an epicyclic gearset, which can provide more gear ratios with significantly fewer components than prior models could.

It was first realized in 2000 with the 6HP from ZF Friedrichshafen. The Ford 6R, AWTF-80 SC, and ZF 6HP transmissions are based on the same globally patented gearset concept. The AWTF-80 SC is the only one for transverse engine installation.

== Key data ==
Gear ratios (Note: Differences in gear ratios have a measurable, direct impact on vehicle dynamics, performance, waste emissions as well as fuel mileage)
Model	First Deliv- ery	Gear							Total Span			Avg. Step	Components		Nomenclature			
Model	First Deliv- ery	R	1	2	3	4	5	6	Nomi- nal	Effec- tive	Cen- ter	Avg. Step	Total	per Gear (Note: Forward gears only)	Gears Count	Cou- pling	Gear- sets	Maximum Input Torque
6L 45 · 6L 50	2005	−3.200	4.065	2.371	1.551	1.157	0.853	0.674	6.035	4.751	1.655	1.433	3 Gearsets; 2 Brakes; 3 Clutches	1.333	6	L (Note: Installation: longitudinal engine)		500 N⋅m (369 lb⋅ft)
6L 80 · 6L 90	2005	−3.064	4.027	2.364	1.532	1.152	0.852	0.667	6.040	4.596	1.638	1.433	3 Gearsets; 2 Brakes; 3 Clutches	1.333	6	L		800 N⋅m (590 lb⋅ft) · 1,200 N⋅m (885 lb⋅ft)
ZF 6HP (Note: first transmission to use the 6-speed Lepelletier planetary gearset)	2000	−3.403	4.171	2.340	1.521	1.143	0.867	0.691	6.035	4.924	1.698	1.433	3 Gearsets; 2 Brakes; 3 Clutches	1.333	6	H (Note: Hydraulic torque converter · German: Hydraulischer Wandler oder Drehmomentwandler)	P (Note: Planetary gearing · German: Planetenradsätze)	400 N⋅m (295 lb⋅ft) – 750 N⋅m (553 lb⋅ft)

== History ==
The series was first launched with the 6L 80 in the 2006 Cadillac STS-V, with the remaining three versions all first appearing in 2007 model year vehicles. The 6L 90 was a strengthened and uprated version of the 6L 80, used primarily in heavy-duty truck/van applications. The 6L 50 was used on V8-powered versions of the Cadillac STS sedan and Cadillac SRX crossover, and replaced the 5L 40-E and 5L 50 in GM's lineup. The 6L 45 was a smaller version of the 6L 50, used in certain BMW vehicles and the Cadillac ATS, as part of either rear-wheel drive and all-wheel drive powertrains.

== Production ==
The 6L 80 and 6L 90 were assembled at GM Powertrain plants in Ypsilanti, MI (Willow Run Transmission), Toledo, Ohio (Toledo Transmission) and Silao, Guanajuato, Mexico, while the smaller 6L 45 and 6L 50 were produced at those same Toledo and Silao plants, as well as at a GM Powertrain plant in Strasbourg, France. All four models feature clutch to clutch shifting, eliminating the one-way clutches used on older transmission designs.

== Planetary gearset concept ==
=== Improved fuel economy ===
The main objective in replacing the predecessor model was to improve vehicle fuel economy with extra speeds and a wider gear span to allow the engine speed level to be lowered (downspeeding), which is a decisive factor in improving energy efficiency and thus reducing fuel consumption. In addition, the lower engine speed level improves the noise-vibration-harshness comfort and the exterior noise is reduced. It has a torque converter lock-up for all 6 forward gears, which can be fully disengage when stationary, largely closing the fuel efficiency gap between vehicles with automatic and manual transmissions.

=== Reduced manufacturing complexity ===
In order to avoid a further increase in manufacturing complexity while expanding the number of gear ratios, ZF switched from the conventional design method—in which the planetary gearset concept was limited to a purely serial or in-line power flow—to a more modern design method that utilizes a planetary gearset concept with combined parallel and serial power flow. This was only possible thanks to computer-aided design and has resulted in a globally patented gearset concept. The 6L is based on the 6HP from ZF, which was the first transmission designed according to this new paradigm. After gaining additional gear ratios only with additional components, this time the number of components has to decrease while the number of ratios still increase. The resulting progress is reflected in a much better ratio of the number of gears to the number of components used compared to existing layouts.

=== Quality ===
The ratios of the 6 gears are nicely evenly distributed in all versions. Exceptions are the large step from 1st to 2nd gear and the almost geometric steps from 3rd to 4th to 5th gear. They cannot be eliminated without affecting all other gears. As the large step is shifted due to the large span to a lower speed range than with conventional gearboxes, it is less significant. As the gear steps are smaller overall due to the additional gear(s), the geometric gear steps are still smaller than the corresponding gear steps of conventional gearboxes. Overall, therefore, the weaknesses are not overly significant. As the selected gearset concept saves up to 2 components compared to 5-speed transmissions, the advantages clearly outweigh the disadvantages.

The layout brings the ability to shift in a non-sequential manner – going from gear 6 to gear 2 in extreme situations simply by changing one shift element (actuating clutch E and releasing brake A).

In a Lepelletier planetary gearset, a conventional planetary gearset and a composite Ravigneaux gearset are combined to reduce both the size and weight as well as the manufacturing costs. Like all transmissions realized with Lepelletier transmissions, the 6L also dispenses with the use of the direct gear ratio and is thus one of the very few automatic transmission concepts without such a ratio.

== Applications ==
Variants and applications
Model	Car Model (Note: w/o any claim of completeness)
6L 45	2007–2010: BMW X3 - 3.0si / 2.5si / 3.0i; 2007–2013: BMW 3 series - 330(x)i / 328(x)i / 325(x)i / 323i / 320i / 318i / 316i; 2007–2019: BMW 1 series - 130i / 128i / 125i / 120i / 118i / 116i; 2009–2015: BMW X1 (E84) - 2.8i xDrive / 2.5i xDrive / 1.8i sDrive; 2013–2015: Cadillac ATS; 2010–2013: Cadillac SLS; 2012–2017: Chevrolet Caprice PPV V6; 2011–2013: Holden VE Commodore, Calais, SV6; 2013–2017: Holden VF Commodore, Calais, SV6
6L 50	2007–2011: Cadillac SLS; 2007–2011: Cadillac STS; 2007–2009: Cadillac SRX; 2008–2015: Cadillac CTS; 2010–2015: Camaro LS/LT (V6 Models); 2009–2011: Holden VE Commodore / Holden VE Berlina / Holden VE Calais / Chevrolet Lumina / Chevrolet Omega; 2009–2011: Holden WM Statesman/Caprice / Daewoo Veritas; 2015–2022: Chevrolet Colorado; 2017–2020: Tata Hexa; 2019–2023: UAZ Patriot; 2022: Bremach
6L 80	2006–2009 Cadillac XLR-V; 2006–2013 Chevrolet Corvette; 2006 Holden VE Commodore/2008-2009 Pontiac G8; 2006–2013 Holden/Chevrolet WM Statesman/Caprice; 2014–2017 Holden/Chevrolet WN Statesman/Caprice; 2007–2013 GMC Sierra Denali; 2009–2013 Chevrolet Silverado 1500 5.3 (ext. & crew cab), 6.2; 2009–2013 GMC Sierra 1500 5.3 (ext. & crew cab), 6.2; 2010–2013 Chevrolet Silverado 1500 5.3 (reg. cab); 2010–2013 GMC Sierra 1500 5.3 (reg. cab); 2006–2009 Cadillac STS-V; 2007–2015 Cadillac Escalade; 2007–2015 Cadillac Escalade ESV; 2007–2013 Cadillac Escalade EXT; 2007–2015 GMC Yukon Denali; 2009–2020 Chevrolet Tahoe; 2009–2020 GMC Yukon; 2009–2020 Chevrolet Suburban 1500; 2009–2020 GMC Yukon XL; 2008–2009 Hummer H2; 2014–2019 (K2XX) Chevrolet Silverado/GMC Sierra 1500; 2010–2015 Chevrolet Camaro; 2011–2017 Chevrolet Caprice; 2011–2013 Holden VE Commodore Series 2(MY 2012); 2014–2017 Holden VF Commodore / Chevrolet SS; 2009–2013 Chevrolet Avalanche; 2019–2021 (T1XX) Chevrolet Silverado/GMC Sierra 1500
6L 90	2007–2014 Chevrolet Silverado 2500HD/3500 HD 6.0; 2007–2014 GMC Sierra 2500HD/3500HD 6.0; 2010–2023 Chevrolet Express 2500–3500; 2010–2023 GMC Savana 2500–3500; 2008–2019 Chevrolet Suburban 2500; 2009–2013 Cadillac CTS-V; 2012–2015 Chevrolet Camaro ZL1; 2015–2019 Chevrolet Silverado 2500HD/3500 HD 6.0; 2015–2019 GMC Sierra 2500HD/3500HD 6.0; 2020–2023 Chevrolet Silverado 2500HD/3500 HD 6.6 L8T; 2020–2023 GMC Sierra 2500HD/3500HD 6.6 L8T

== See also ==
- List of GM transmissions
- "GM Launches More Fuel-Saving Six-Speed Automatic Transmissions". GM Media Online.
- Cadillac PDF info on 6L 80-E Transmission: http://www.cadillacfaq.com/stsfaq/tsb/data/tsb/05-07-30-023.pdf
- "GM Ypsilanti Begins 6-Speed Production". Automotive Design and Production. Archived from the original on March 3, 2006.
- Lepelletier planetary gearset
- ZF 6HP transmission
- Ford 6R transmission
- Aisin AWTF-80 SC
