= GM 5L40-E transmission =

5L40-E/5L50

Overview
- Manufacturer: General Motors
- Production: 1998–2009

Body and chassis
- Class: 5-speed longitudinal automatic transmission

Chronology
- Predecessor: 4L30-E; 4L60-E/4L65-E
- Successor: 6L 45 · 6L 50

The 5L40-E (and similar 5L50) are a series of automatic transmissions made by General Motors. Designed for longitudinal engine configurations, the series includes 5 forward gears and is used in the GM Sigma platform vehicles from Cadillac, the Pontiac Solstice, BMW, and Holden Commodore.

The electronically controlled transmission is designed around a fully articulated Ravigneaux planetary gearset that is controlled by electronically timed application of several range-specific hydraulic clutches, in combination with mechanical one-way sprag clutches. The 5L40E unit's centerpiece is an automatic overdrive which supersedes the French-made 4L30E four-speed automatic light-duty gearboxes, and like them features a torque converter clutch to eliminate slipping losses in select forward ranges. It is assembled in Strasbourg, France.

The 5L40/50 series was replaced in 2007 with the 6L50 six-speed.

== 5L40-E (A5S360R) ==
The 5L40-E was designated in either "M82" (rear-wheel drive) or "MX5" (all-wheel drive) versions for service in BMW vehicles from 1999 model year until the design was superseded by (for BMW) the 6L45E and (for all others) the 6L50E series electronic automatic transmissions in 2007 . It is designed for service in vehicles up to 4000 lb (1814 kg) GVWR and in service was mated to a selection of final drive ratios 3.42:1, 3.73:1, or 3.91:1 depending on the carline. The 5L40-E had been designed for 1.8–3.6 L engines with a maximum of 250 ft·lbf (340 N·m) of torque. It was overestimate when used in combination of M57D30 engines. As the M57D30 rated torque output of 390/410Nm.

Gear ratios:

1	2	3	4	5	R
3.42	2.21	1.60	1.00	0.75	3.02

Applications:

- 3.42:1 M82
  - 2004–2006 Cadillac CTS (RWD)
  - 2005–2006 Cadillac STS (RWD)
- 3.73:1 M82
  - 2004–2006 Cadillac SRX (RWD)
- 3.91:1 M82
  - 2006-2009 Pontiac Solstice
  - 2007-2009 Saturn Sky
- 2.92:1 M82
  - 2004–2006 Holden WL Statesman/Caprice (RWD)
  - 2004–2006 Holden VZ Commodore (RWD)
  - 2005–2009 Chevrolet Omega (RWD)
  - 2006–2009 Holden VE Commodore (RWD)
  - 2008–2009 Pontiac G8 (RWD)
- 3.42:1 MX5
  - 2004–2006 Cadillac CTS (AWD)
  - 2004–2006 Cadillac STS (AWD)
- 3.91:1 MX5
  - 2004–2006 Cadillac SRX (AWD)
- 3.08:1
  - BMW 3 Series (E46)
- BMW 5 Series (E39) Underrated when used with M57D30 engines
- BMW Z3
- Range Rover (L322) Td6 diesels with BMW M57 engines only

== 5L50 (A5S390R) ==
The 5L50 is engineered to handle the stresses from vehicles weighing up to 5000 lb (2268 kg) GVWR. Final drive ratios include 2.93:1 and 3.23:1. The 5L50 can handle up to 311 ft·lbf (422 N·m) of torque.

Gear ratios:

1	2	3	4	5	R
3.42	2.21	1.60	1.00	0.75	3.02

Applications:

- 2.93:1 M22
  - 2004–2006 Cadillac XLR
- 3.23:1 MV3/M22
  - 2005–2006 Cadillac STS
  - 2004–2006 Cadillac SRX
  - 2001-2004 BMW X5 E53 3.0d
  - 2001-2006 BMW 325XI, 330XI E46 2.5i, 3.0i
  - 2004-2006 BMW 330CD E46 3.0d

== See also ==
- List of GM transmissions

== Other links ==
- Cadillac CTS Homepage
- Caddyinfo.com - Cadillac Discussion Forum, How-To, and Technical Information]
- Sonnax Industries 5L40E/5L50-E: Isolating Concerns re: Loss of Reverse or TCC by SONNAX
