= Cadillac STS =

American full-size sedan

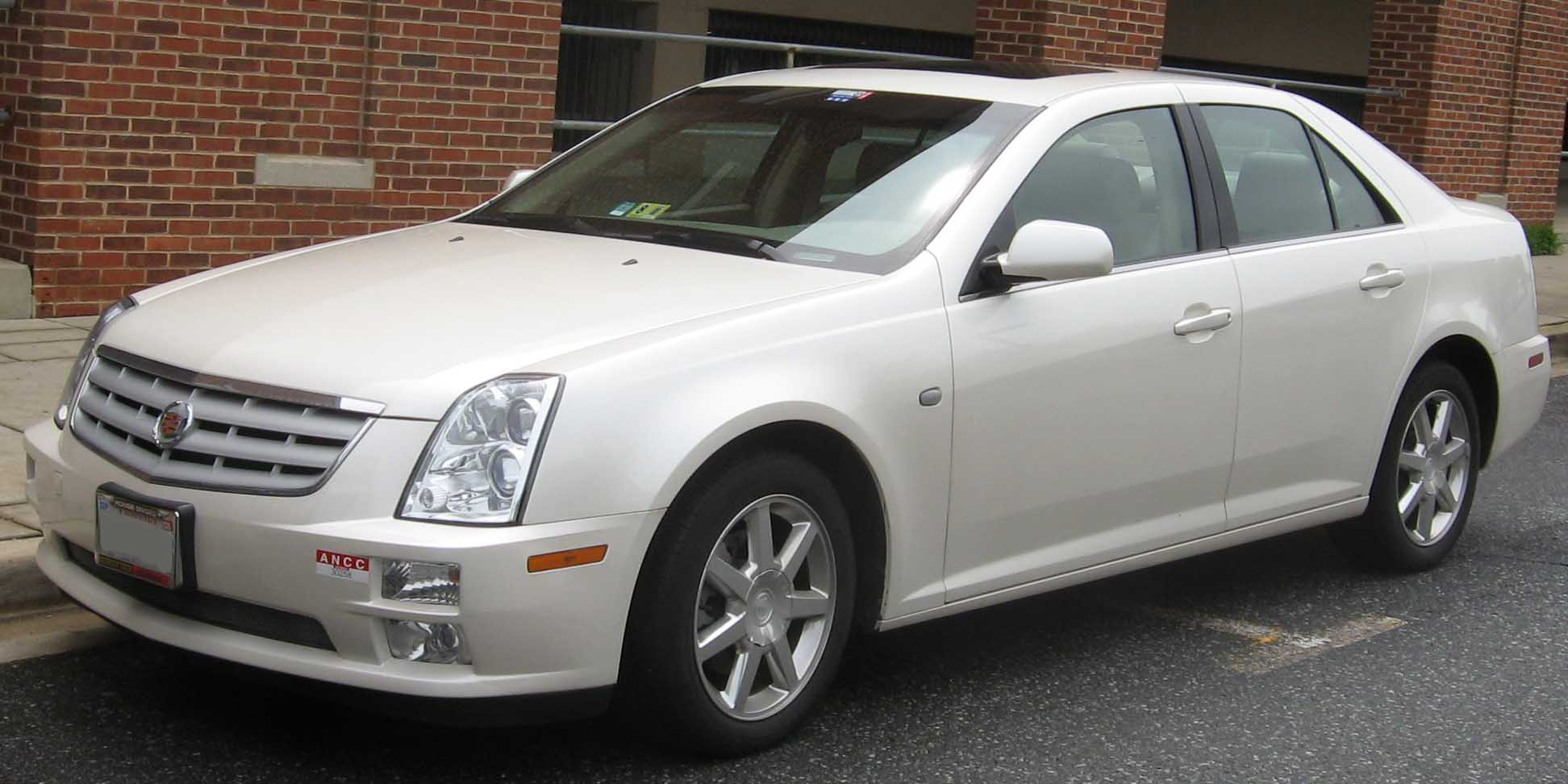

Overview
- Manufacturer: General Motors; Shanghai GM (SLS)
- Also called: Cadillac SLS (China)
- Production: 2004–2011; November 2006 – February 2013 (China)
- Model years: 2005–2011; 2007–2013 (China)
- Assembly: United States: Lansing, Michigan; China: Shanghai (Shanghai GM); Russia: Kaliningrad (Avtotor)
- Designer: John K. Wasenko (2001); James C. Shyr (SLS)

Body and chassis
- Class: Mid-size luxury car
- Body style: 4-door sedan
- Layout: Front-engine, Rear wheel drive / Front-engine, four-wheel drive
- Platform: GM Sigma platform/GMX295
- Related: Cadillac CTS; Cadillac SRX

Powertrain
- Engine: 2.0 L LDK I4; 2.8 L LP1 V6; 3.0 L LF1 V6; 3.6 L LLT V6; 3.6 L LY7 V6 (gasoline); 4.4 L Northstar LC3 V8 (supercharged gasoline); 4.6 L Northstar LH2 V8 (gasoline)
- Transmission: 5-speed 5L40-E automatic; 5-speed 5L50 automatic; 6-speed 6L45 automatic; 6-speed 6L50 automatic

Dimensions
- Wheelbase: 116.4 in (2,957 mm) (STS SWB); 120.3 in (3,056 mm) (SLS LWB)
- Length: 2005–2007: 196.3 in (4,986 mm); 2008–2011: 196.7 in (4,996 mm); V: 197.6 in (5,019 mm); SLS LWB: 200.5 in (5,093 mm)
- Width: 72.6 in (1,844 mm)
- Height: 57.6 in (1,463 mm) (STS SWB); 58.2 in (1,478 mm) (SLS LWB)
- Curb weight: 3,922 lb (1,779 kg) (STS SWB); 4,199–4,255 lb (1,905–1,930 kg) (SLS LWB)

Chronology
- Predecessor: Cadillac Seville SLS/STS
- Successor: Cadillac XTS

The Cadillac STS (an initialism of Seville Touring Sedan) is a mid-sized luxury 4-door sedan manufactured and marketed by General Motors from 2004 to 2011 for the 2005 to 2011 model years. A version of the STS was marketed in China as the SLS through 2013.

It was equipped with a six-speed automatic transmission with performance algorithm shifting and driver shift control.

The STS succeeded the Cadillac Seville, which has been available beginning with the 1987 model year in a performance-oriented trim, marketed as the STS, for Seville Touring Sedan.

While smaller than the full-size DTS, the more expensive STS was the flagship sedan of the Cadillac brand.

== Safety ==
The Cadillac STS was rated with a four star frontal and five star rear passenger crash test rating from the National Highway Traffic Safety Administration. It was given an overall "Good" score in the Insurance Institute for Highway Safety frontal crash test and an "Acceptable" rating in the side impact test. In the side impact test injury measurements to the driver's pelvis was rated "Poor" and for the torso "Acceptable."

== 2005–2007 ==
The front wheel drive Seville was retired in 2004, succeeded by the "STS," using the rear wheel drive GM Sigma platform. The first Cadillac sedan to be offered with All wheel drive, the STS retained the Seville's high-performance Magnetic Ride Control suspension. The STS was assembled at GM's Lansing Grand River facility in Lansing, Michigan along with the smaller CTS sedan.

Available engines were a 3.6 L High Feature LY7 V6 with 255 hp (190 kW) and 252 lb⋅ft (342 N⋅m) and the 4.6 L Northstar LH2 V8 which puts out 320 hp (240 kW) and 315 lb⋅ft (427 N⋅m) in the STS. All engine models feature dual overhead camshafts with variable valve timing. Remote ignition is standard, as is a push-button starter borrowed from the Corvette C6.

Overall length was down 5" to 196.3", yet wheelbase grew by 4" to 116.4 in (2,957 mm), resulting in increased interior space.

Cadillac offered the STS in six trims, with the STS-V trim added for 2006:

- STS V6 (1SA)
- STS V6 Luxury (1SB)
- STS V6 Luxury Performance (1SC)
- STS V8 Luxury (1SE)
- STS V8 Luxury Performance (1SF)
- STS V8 Premium Luxury Performance (1SG)

A heads-up display/adaptive cruise control package with road-sensing HID Xenon headlights was optional with the 1SG trim for early 2004 models. This package became a V8 option for 2005. A 300-watt, 15-speaker, Bose Dolby 5.1 Surround Sound touchscreen navigation system with MP3 playback capability, XM satellite radio, Bluetooth connectivity, in-dash 6-disc DVD changer (the first vehicle to ever offer an in-dash DVD changer,) video input jack, and screen tilt feature is standard for all Luxury Performance (1SC, 1SF) trims (which this system would later be shared with the third generation 2007–2014 GMT926/36/46 Escalade.) The 1SF trim also adds ventilated front seats as standard equipment. Other options included a one-touch power tilt/slide sunroof, a High Performance brake/tire package, and Tuscany leather interior.

AWD was introduced as a V8 option for early 2004 cars, and was added to the V6 for 2005. The AWD option can be identified by the "STS4" trunklid badge, and a narrowed front passenger floorboard (to allow space for the transfer case components.) The STS-V is not available with AWD.

Base pricing at launch ranged from US$40,575 for the V6 model to US$47,025 for the V8.

== 2008–2011 ==
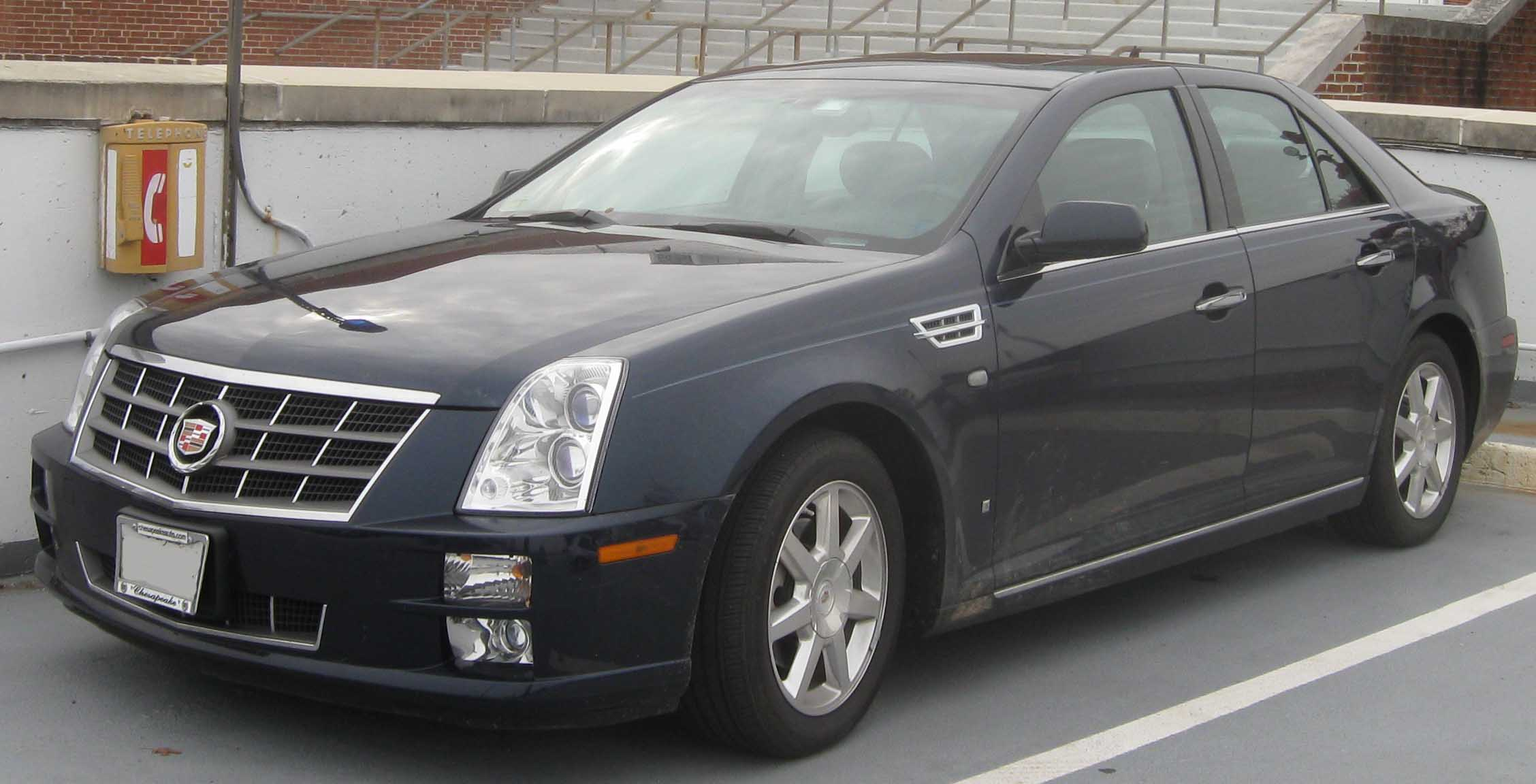
2008–2011 Cadillac STS

The STS for the 2008 model year received minor exterior revisions, including a larger grille and chrome fender vents. The interior received revised materials and a new steering wheel.

The standard powertrain was a direct-injected 3.6 L V6 mated to a six-speed automatic transmission, which in the STS produced 302 hp (225 kW) and 272 lb⋅ft (369 N⋅m) of torque. Optional safety features included a lane departure warning system developed by Mobileye, a blind spot monitoring system, and an improved version of GM's StabiliTrak stability control system, which could operate the steering system in addition to the brakes to help correct a skid. Options previously limited to the V8 model (such as HID headlamps and Automotive head-up display) were available with the V6. The 2008 Cadillac STS debuted at the 2007 New York Auto Show.

A 2010 update for the STS removed the GM badges, although early 2010 models still retained GM badging. For 2011, the V8 was dropped from the Cadillac STS lineup.

== STS-V ==
Cadillac STS-V
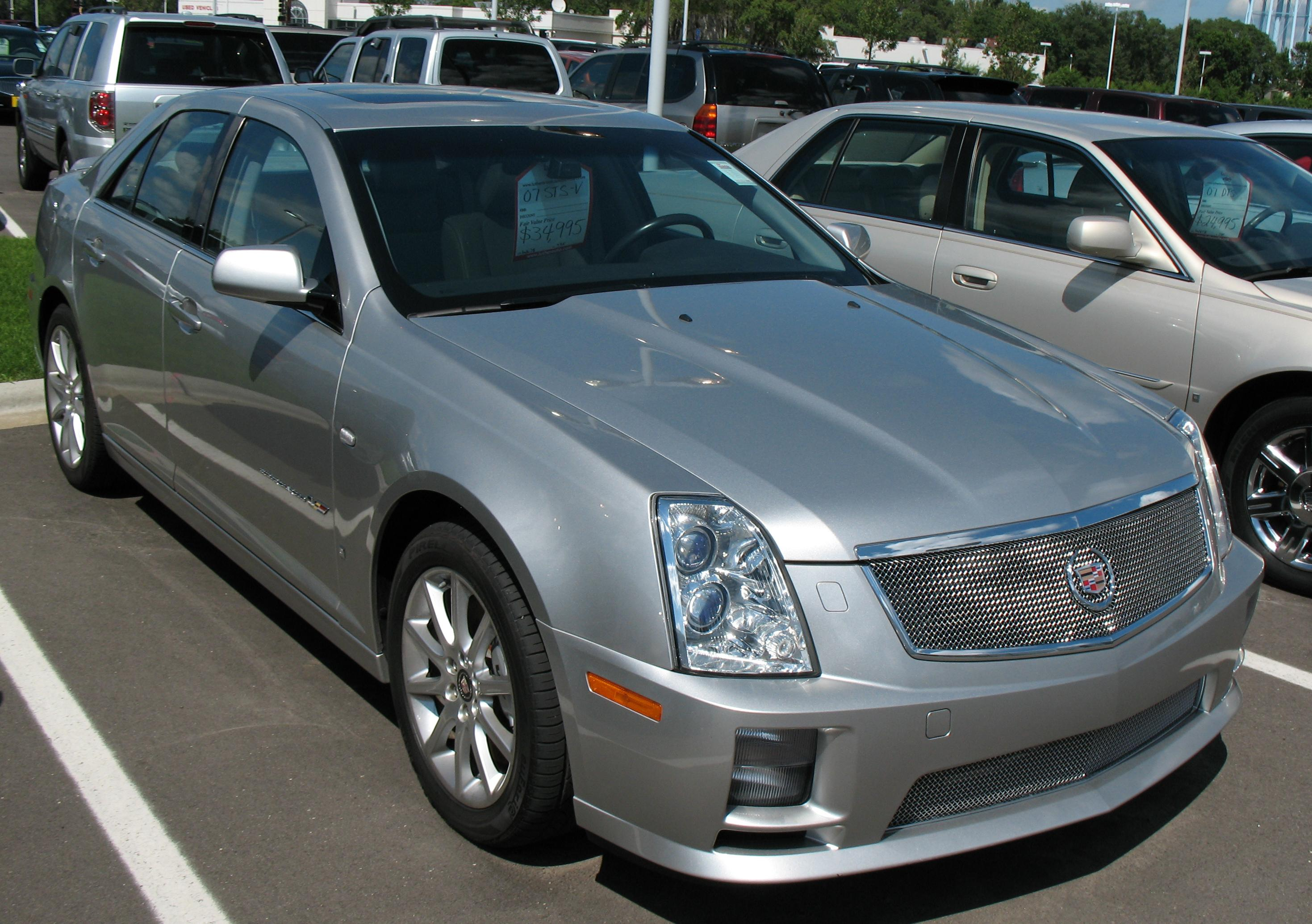

Overview
- Manufacturer: General Motors
- Production: 2005–2009
- Model years: 2006–2009
- Assembly: United States: Lansing, Michigan

Body and chassis
- Class: Mid-size luxury car
- Body style: 4-door sedan
- Layout: FR layout
- Platform: GM Sigma platform
- Related: Cadillac STS

Powertrain
- Engine: 4.4 L Northstar LC3 V8
- Transmission: 6-speed 6L80 automatic

Dimensions
- Wheelbase: 116.4 in (2,957 mm)
- Length: 197.6 in (5,019 mm)
- Width: 72.6 in (1,844 mm)
- Height: 58.2 in (1,478 mm)

Chronology
- Successor: Cadillac CT6-V

The Cadillac STS-V is a high-performance executive car of the V-Series introduced at the 2005 Detroit Auto Show, and was available for sale in late 2005.

The STS-V uses a supercharged 4.4 L version of the Northstar V8, producing 469 hp (350 kW) and 439 lb⋅ft (595 N⋅m). This engine is mated to a driver-adjustable GM automatic transmission with two shifting modes, larger brakes by Brembo, larger 10 spoke alloy wheels (18"x8.5" front, 19"x9.5" rear), Pirelli run-flat tires, a faster steering ratio, and a stiffer suspension than the standard STS. The engine block and cylinder heads are aluminum, the camshafts are cast iron, and the crankshaft is forged steel. Suspension is fully independent and there are four settings for the traction control system and stability control. Also different from the standard STS, the STS-V has a cooler for the rear differential oil located on the underside of the car behind the 3rd member.

- Displacement: 4,371 cc (267 cu in)
- Power: 469 hp (350 kW; 476 PS) at 6400 rpm (SAE-certified)
- Torque: 439 lb⋅ft (595 N⋅m) at 3900 rpm
- Redline: 6700 rpm
- Compression ratio: 9.0:1
- Fuel economy: EPA est. 16.4 mpg_{‑US} (14.3 L/100 km; 19.7 mpg_{‑imp})/17 mpg_{‑US} (14 L/100 km; 20 mpg_{‑imp}) (City/highway) 13/19 - real world is about 14 mpg city and 21 to 23 mpg highway.

The STS-V had a 0-60 mph (97 km/h) acceleration time of 4.6 seconds and a 13.2 second quarter mile time.

The STS-V's primary visual difference from the standard STS was a wire mesh grille and a 'power-dome' hood as well as six lug wheels normally seen only on larger SUVs, trucks and pickups. In addition to the grille, the front differences include the bumper, the fog light and turning signal cluster, and the hood which is slightly domed to fit over the supercharger. In the rear, the bumper is different from the standard STS and includes a wire mesh insert at the bottom which is made of the same mesh material used in the front grille. The rear spoiler is taller and wider, and encompasses the third brake light.

For the interior, the STS-V also has upgraded leather and Ultrasuede trim, by the German company Dräxlmaier, in either Ebony and Gray, both of which are offered on the standard STS as well, and a two-tone Ebony/Tango Red scheme which was unique to the STS-V.

STS-V Production numbers

Model year	Total
2006	1,306 - 55 were exported to various countries
2007	642 - 65 were exported to various countries
2008	459 - 32 were exported to various countries
2009	96 - 4 were exported to Gulf States (Bahrain, Oman, Qatar, United Arab Emirates)
Total	2,503

The model was discontinued in 2009.

== Cadillac SLS (China) ==
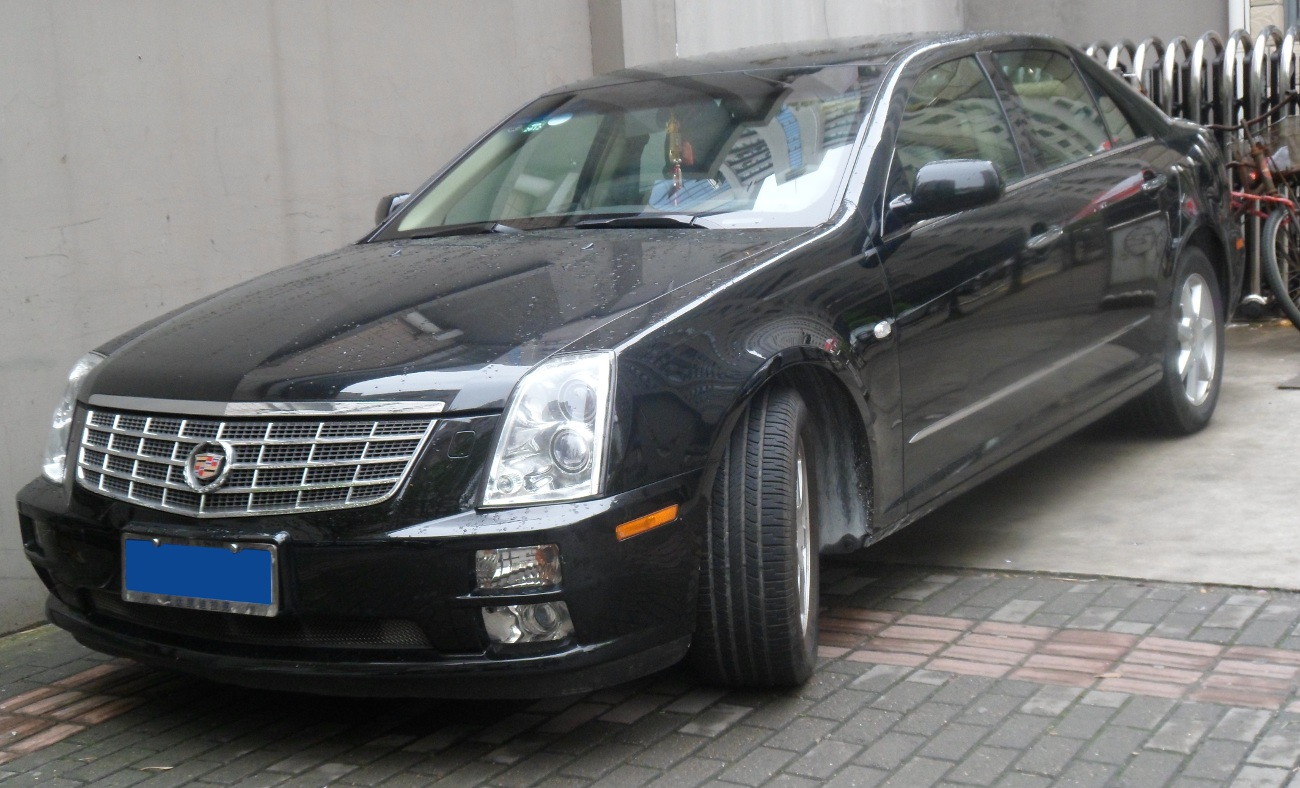
2007–2009 Cadillac SLS

The Chinese market received the Cadillac SLS (for Seville Luxury Sedan) in November 2006 for the 2007 model year. It was assembled by Shanghai GM. Compared to the STS, the SLS has a longer wheelbase, unique interior appointments, and a near-identical exterior appearance. Engine choices included the 2.8-liter LP1 V-6, 3.6 LY7 V-6 and the 4.6-liter Northstar V-8 as in the STS V-8 from 2007 to 2009. The 3.6 liter LLT engine was available from 2010 to 2011 until it was replaced by the 2.0 liter LDK and the 3.0 liter LF1 V6 for 2011 to 2013 models.

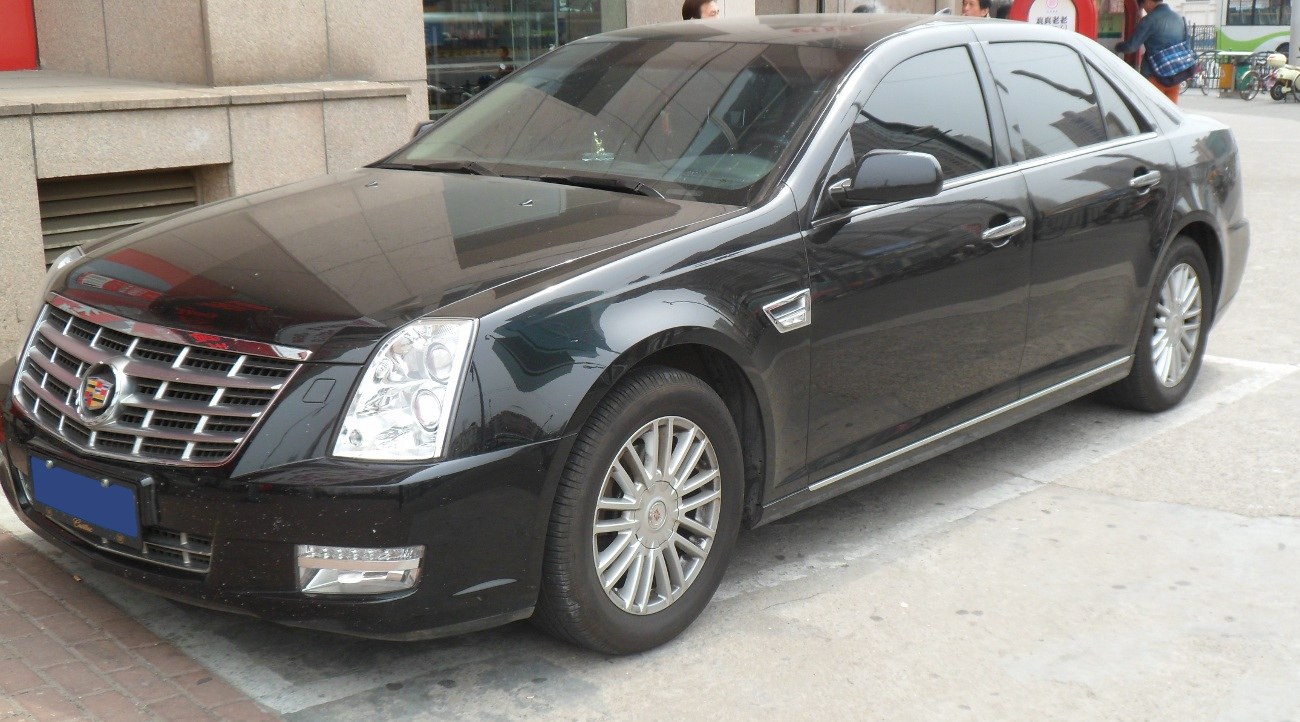
2010–2013 Cadillac SLS

The Chinese-Spec SLS received a facelift at the end of 2009, and was sold as a 2010 model year. The grille, bumper and many other details were revised. It was available in 5 trim levels known as: 2.8 Elite, 2.8 Luxury, 3.6 Elite, 3.6 Luxury and 4.6 Flagship. The SLS was priced from 448,000RMB to 828,000RMB ($94,835 to $175,160 US - August 2022 exchange rate).

GM discontinued the production of the SLS in February 2013.

== Sales ==
Year	U.S
2004	9,484
2005	33,497
2006	25,676
2007	20,873
2008	14,790
2009	6,037
2010	4,473
2011	3,338
2012	164

== Successor ==
The final STS was assembled on May 4, 2011. The enlarged third generation rear-wheel drive CTS sedan introduced in 2013 as a 2014 model, similar in size and price to the STS, effectively succeeded it.
