= Cadillac SRX =

Luxury crossover SUV by Cadillac (2004–2016)

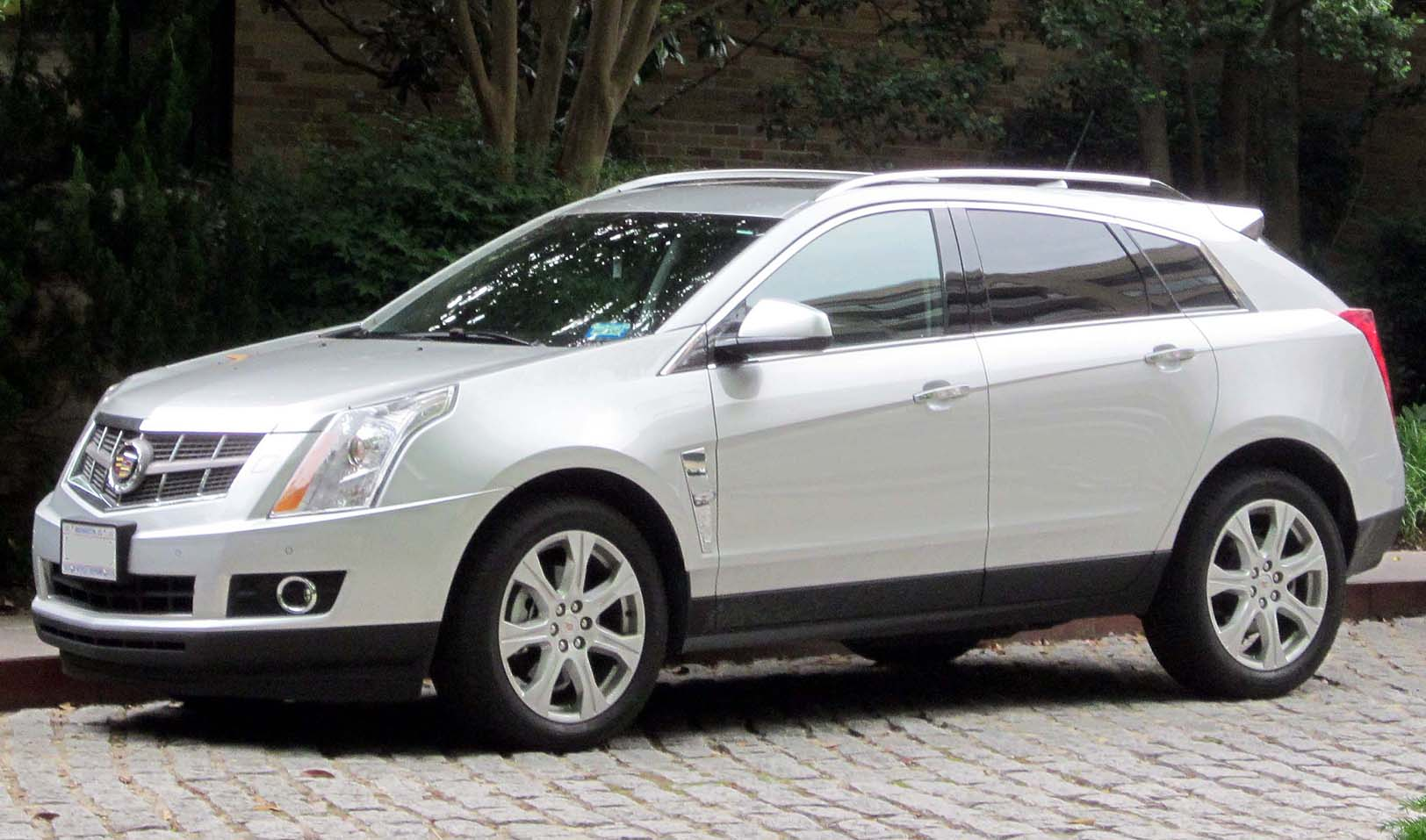

Overview
- Manufacturer: General Motors
- Production: 2003–2016
- Model years: 2004–2016

Body and chassis
- Class: Mid-size luxury SUV (1st generation); Compact luxury crossover SUV (2nd generation)
- Body style: Five-door SUV
- Layout: Front-engine, rear-wheel drive, all-wheel drive (2004–2009); Front-engine, front-wheel drive, all-wheel drive (2010–2016)

Chronology
- Successor: Cadillac XT5; Cadillac XT6 (first-generation 7-passenger models)

The Cadillac SRX is a mid-size luxury SUV and compact luxury crossover SUV manufactured and marketed by Cadillac over two generations: the first generation as a five-door, three-row, seven-passenger CUV (2003–2009), and the second generation as a five-door, two-row, five-passenger CUV (2010–2016) – the latter became Cadillac's best selling model in the United States.

== First generation (2004) ==
First generation
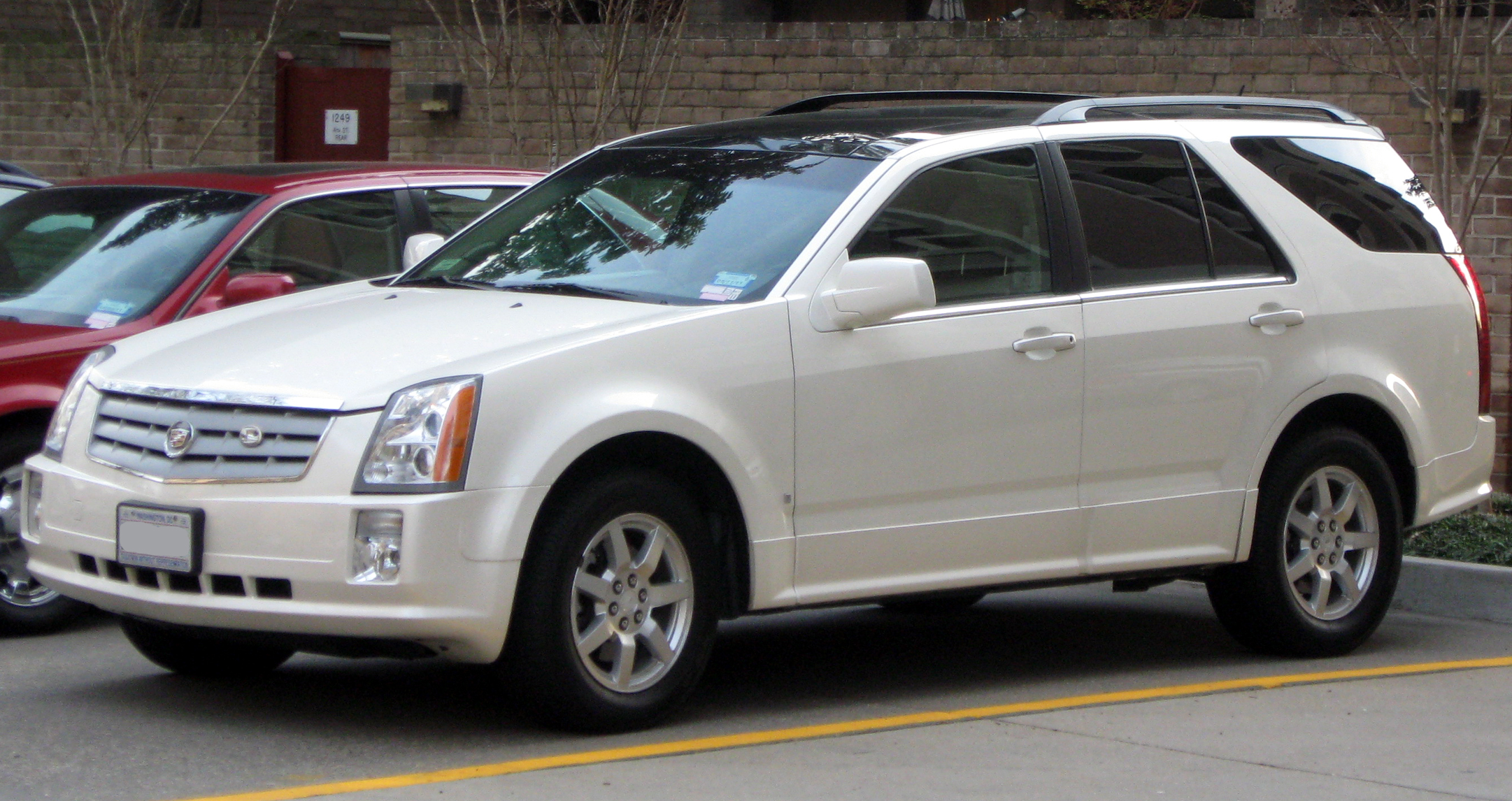

Overview
- Manufacturer: General Motors
- Production: 2003–2009 (US); 2004–2010 (Russia)
- Model years: 2004—2009
- Assembly: United States: Lansing, Michigan (Lansing Grand River Assembly); Russia: Kaliningrad (Avtotor); China: Shanghai (Shanghai GM)

Body and chassis
- Layout: Front-engine, rear-wheel drive / Front-engine, all-wheel drive
- Platform: GM Sigma platform/GMT265
- Related: Cadillac CTS; Cadillac STS

Powertrain
- Engine: 3.6 L LY7 HFV6 V6; 4.6 L LH2 Northstar V8
- Transmission: 5-speed 5L40-E automatic; 5-speed 5L50 automatic; 6-speed 6L50 automatic

Dimensions
- Wheelbase: 116.4 in (2,957 mm)
- Length: 194.9 in (4,950 mm)
- Width: 72.6 in (1,844 mm)
- Height: 67.8 in (1,722 mm)

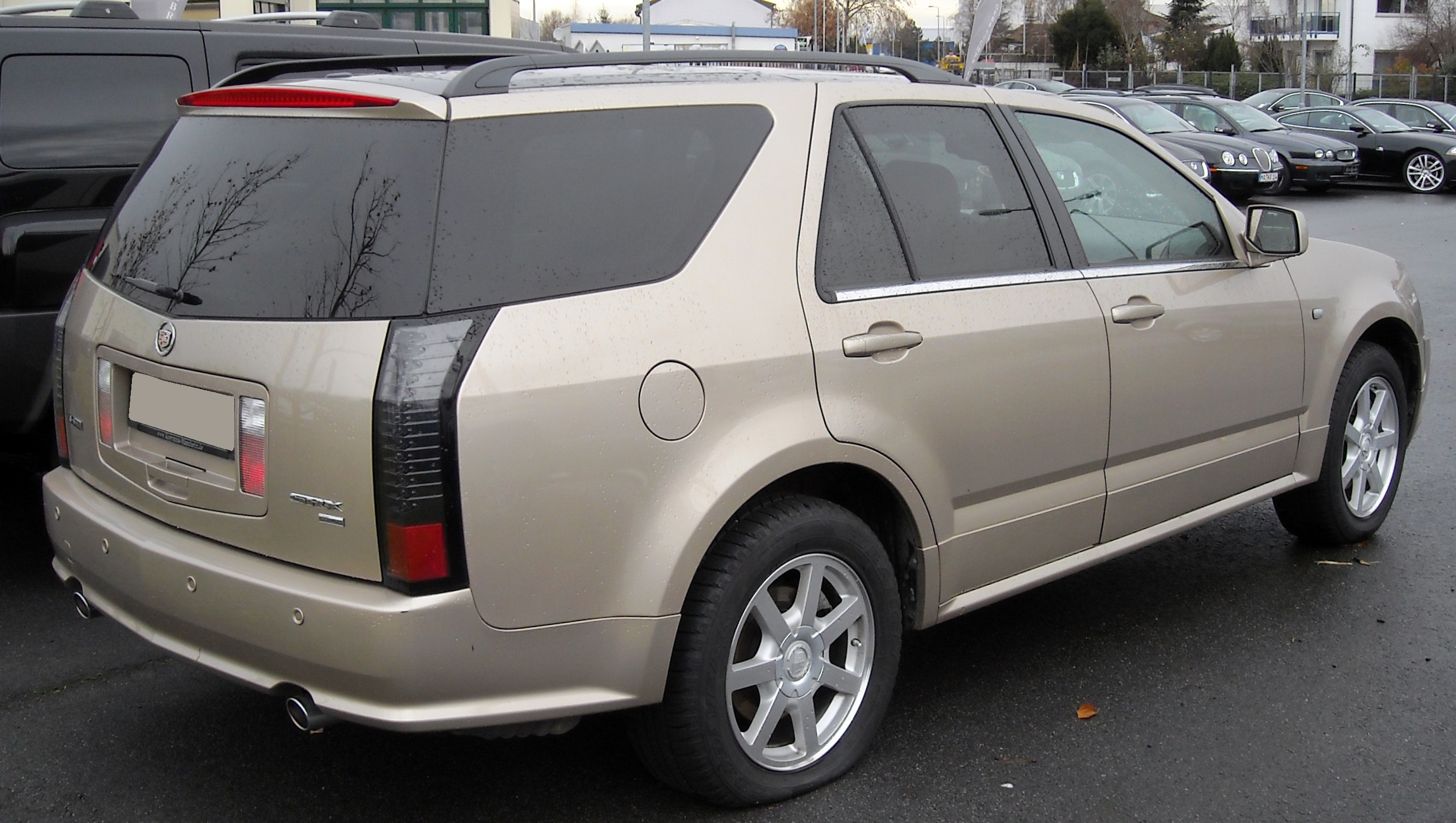
Cadillac SRX (Europe)

The SRX was preceded by the Cadillac Vizon concept, designed by Mike Torpey and introduced at the 2001 North American International Auto Show (NAIAS) in Detroit — rolling down a runway as if it was a fashion model. The Vizon (also seen as Vizón) was conceived as a "soft-road" luxury SUV with angular styling, all-wheel drive, a 300-hp Northstar V-8 engine, and an interior design by Theresa Tant, co-developed with Bulgari.

The SRX's engine options included the 255 hp (190 kW) High-Feature V6 and the 4.6 L 320 hp (239 kW) Northstar V8. It was based on the GM Sigma platform and came with a five or six-speed automatic transmission; rear-wheel drive and four-wheel drive and MagneRide were available. As a Sigma platform vehicle, the first generation SRX had a longitudinally mounted front engine, longitudinal transmission mounted behind the engine, and a rear drive differential. The AWD option was implemented with a transfer case mounted to the rear of the transmission, with a propeller shaft forward to a front differential to power the front wheels.

An all-leather interior and curtain side airbags were standard in both models. Heated front seats and wood interior trim were standard in the V8 and available as options in the V6. DVD, sunroof, navigation system, and a power foldable third-row seat were all available options. However, the third row was no longer available for the 2010 model year on the SRX.

The SRX won Car and Driver's Five Best Trucks "luxury SUV" award for 2004, 2005 and 2006 and was nominated for the North American Truck of the Year award for 2004.

The first generation SRX never had a V Series performance model available.

The first generation SRX was available through the 2009 model year.

The Insurance Institute for Highway Safety found the 2005-08 SRX worst in its class for driver fatalities with a death rate of 63 compared to its class average of 23.

=== 2005 changes ===
For the 2005 model year, Cadillac added chrome accents to the gauge cluster and made the towing package available on V6 models and V8 models. The towing capacity also grew to 4,250 lb (1,928 kg).

=== 2006 changes ===
For the 2006 model year, power tailgate and satellite radio became standard. New wheel designs were also added. New interior wood trim was added to the center stack and ride height was lowered slightly.

=== 2007 changes ===
For the 2007 model year, a new console was implemented, V8 models received a six-speed automatic transmission, and the base audio system was changed to Bose. A Sport package was added which included 20-inch wheels, all-wheel drive and a limited slip differential. Other added options include Bose 5.1 digital surround sound, Theater package (which included Bose 5.1 digital surround sound, navigation and rear seat entertainment), automatic odor filtration, and Passenger Side Inflatable Restraint Suppression.

=== 2008 changes ===
The 2008 SRX received a new three-spoke steering wheel design. All wheel drive models now got an "SRX4" badge on the tailgate.

=== 2009 changes ===
Adaptive Remote Start was added as a new option for the 2009 model year.

== Second generation (2010) ==
Second generation
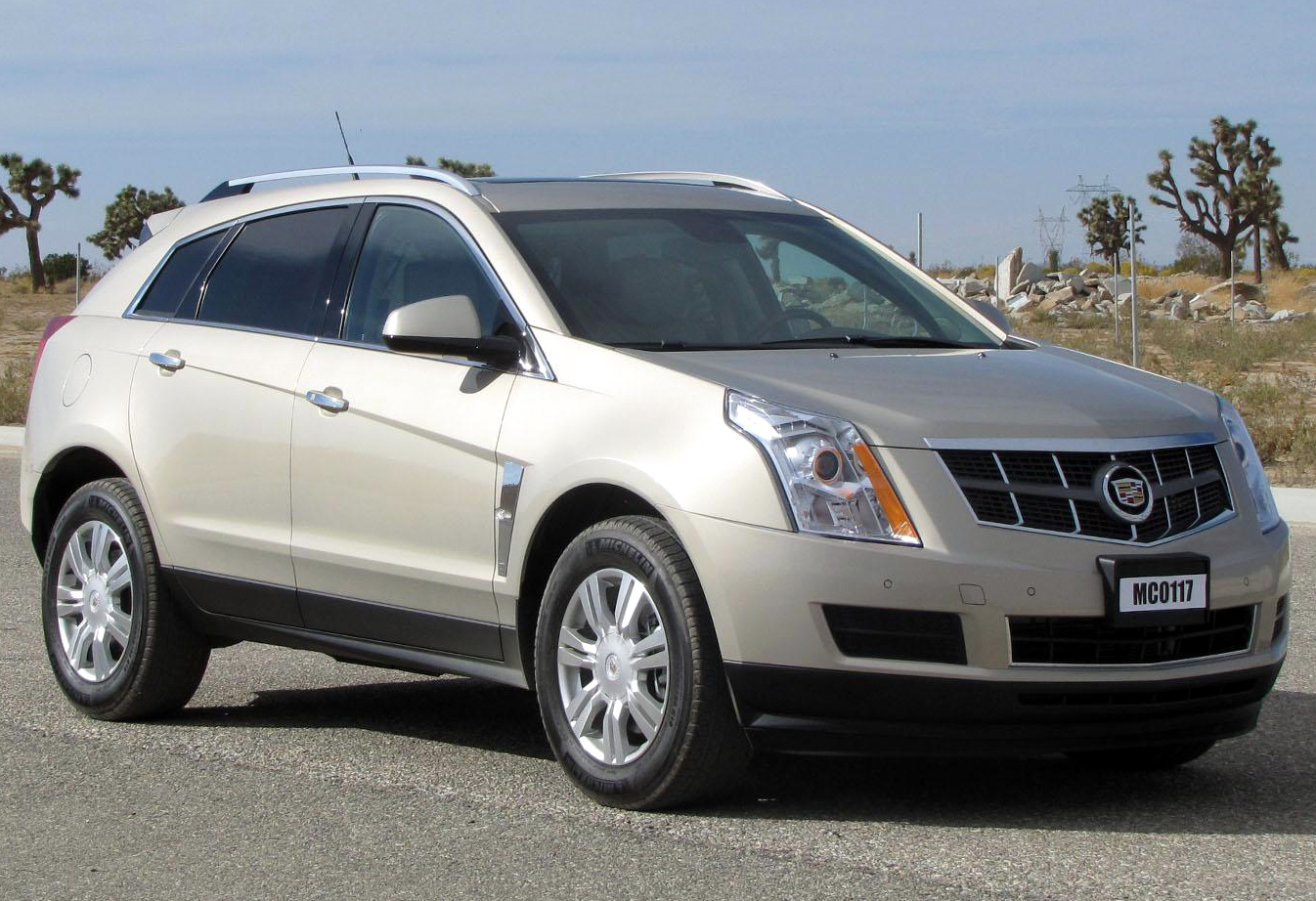

Overview
- Also called: Cadillac SRX L LWB (Europe)
- Production: July 2009–January 2016
- Model years: 2010—2016
- Assembly: Mexico: Ramos Arizpe; Russia: Kaliningrad (Avtotor); Russia: Saint Petersburg (GM, 2014–2015)

Body and chassis
- Layout: Front-engine, front-wheel drive / all-wheel drive
- Platform: GM Theta Premium/GMT166
- Related: Saab 9-4X; Chevrolet Equinox; GMC Terrain

Powertrain
- Engine: 2.8 L LAU V6 (turbocharged gasoline); 3.0 L LF1 V6 (gasoline); 3.6 L LFX V6 (gasoline/E85)
- Transmission: 6-speed GM 6T70 automatic; 6-speed Aisin AF40 automatic

Dimensions
- Wheelbase: 110.5 in (2,807 mm)
- Length: 190.2 in (4,831 mm)
- Width: 75.1 in (1,908 mm)
- Height: 65.7 in (1,669 mm)
- Curb weight: 4,277 lb (1,940 kg) (FWD); 4,442 lb (2,015 kg) (AWD)

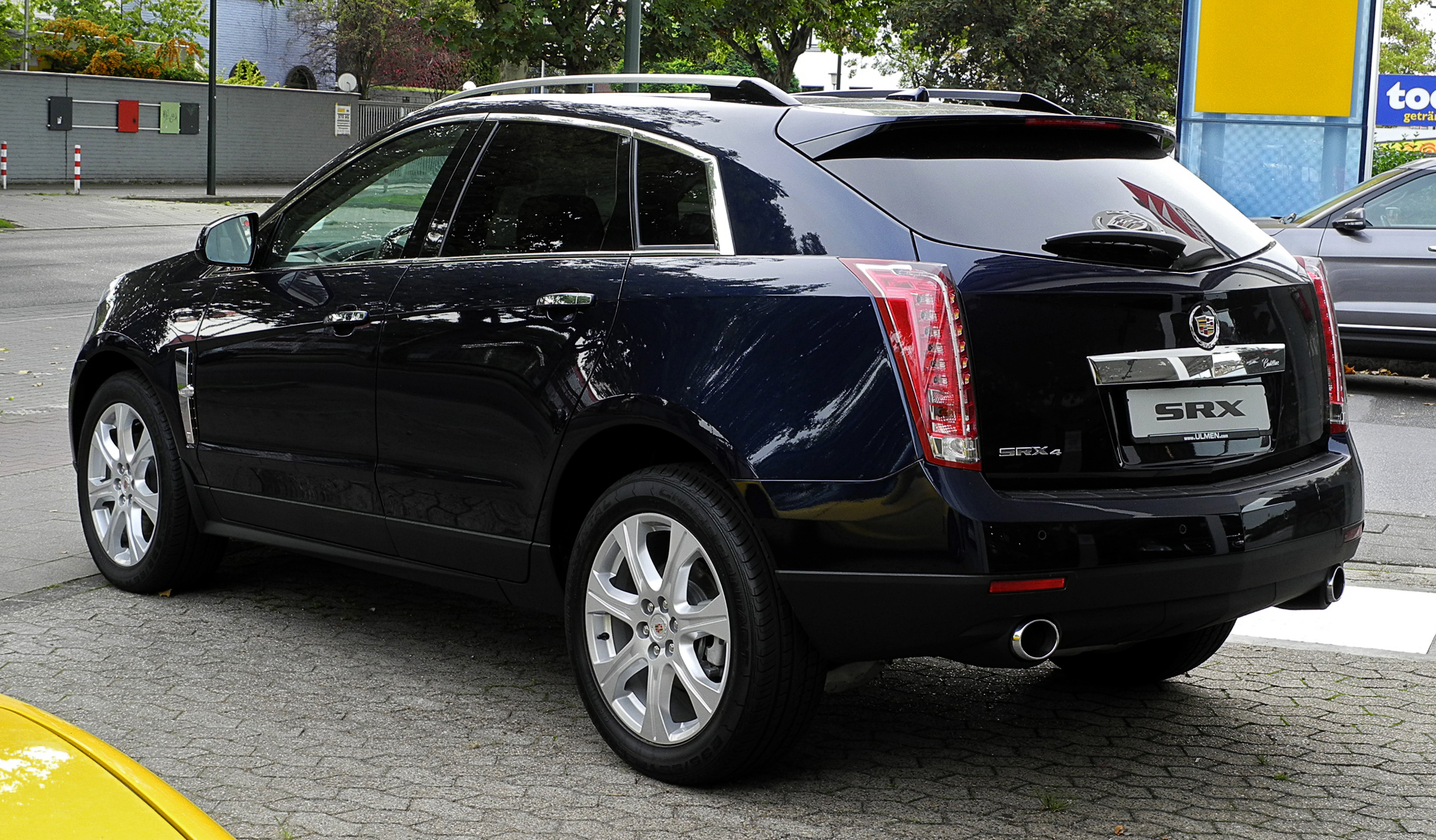
Cadillac SRX 3.0 V6 AWD Sport Luxury (Germany)

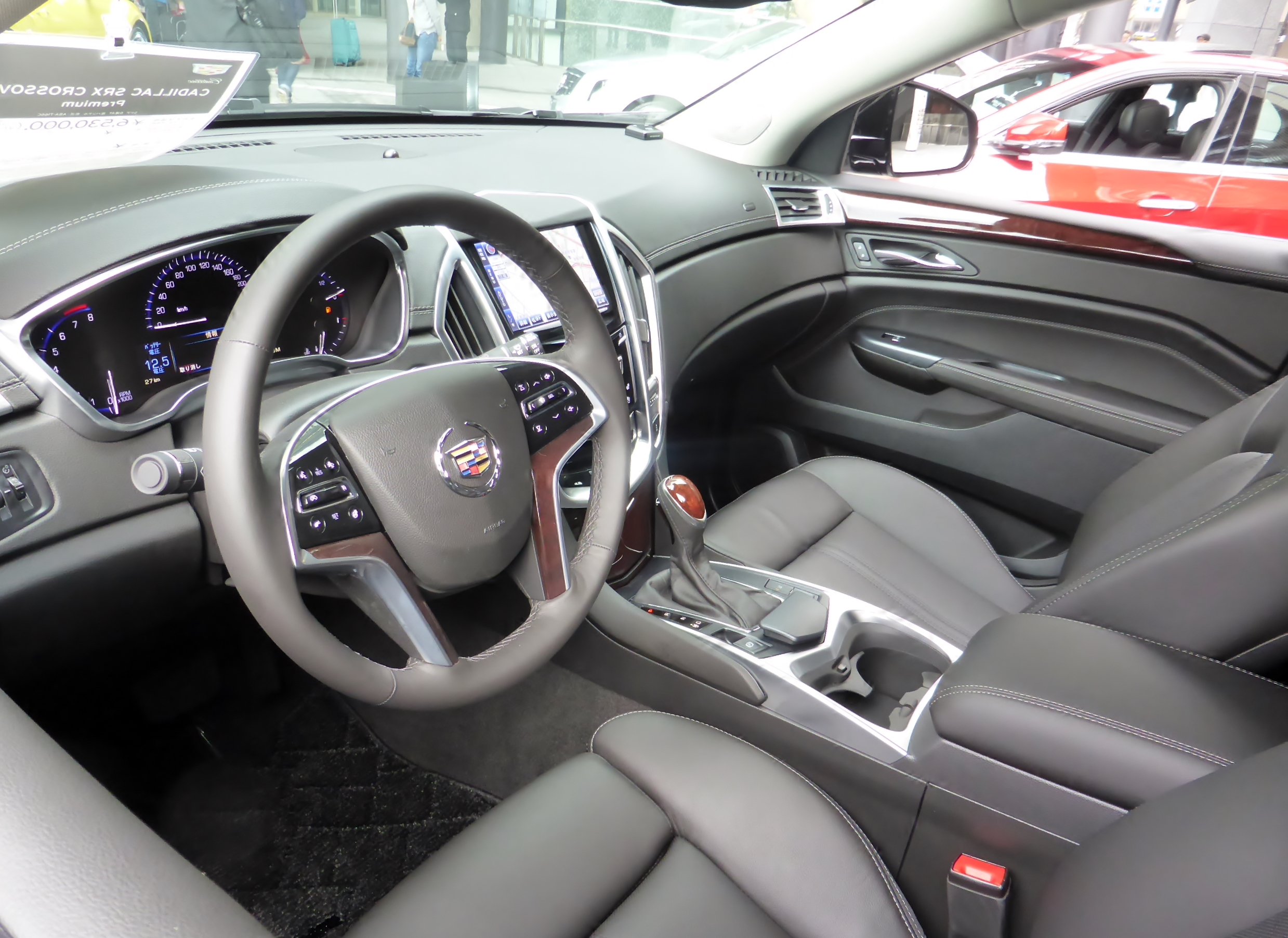
Interior

The second generation SRX followed the Provoq concept presented at the 2008 Detroit NAIAS auto show, using a variation of the Epsilon II platform.

The production SRX debuted in January 2009 with the choice of a 3.0 liter V6 with direct injection derived from the 3.6 liter unit in the Cadillac CTS, or a 2.8 liter turbocharged V6.

As it used the Epsilon platform, the second generation SRX drivetrain was a front transverse mounted V6 engine with a transverse mounted transaxle powering the front wheels. The AWD option was implemented with a power take-off output of the transaxle, and a propeller shaft to a rear differential to power the rear wheels.

2016 was the last model year for the SRX as Cadillac replaced it by the XT5 in the spring of 2016 as a 2017 model.

=== 2011 changes ===
For the 2011 model year, a rear backup camera and Cadillac Premium Care Maintenance program became standard and full keyless access became standard on Luxury and Performance models. In January 2011, General Motors discontinued production of the 2.8 liter turbo-charged V6 engine in the SRX, citing poor sales numbers. Less than 10 percent of SRX buyers opted for the turbo-charged engine. This left the naturally aspirated 3.0 liter V6 as the only engine available for the remainder of the 2011 model year.

=== 2012 changes ===
For 2012, a 3.6 liter V6 with E85 flex-fuel capability was offered in the turbo V6's place. The six-speed transmission received an Eco feature for improved fuel economy. Other additions include Xenon Blue exterior color and ebony interior. Also, Bluetooth hands-free technology became standard on all trims and a heated steering wheel became available.

=== 2013 facelift ===
For the 2013 model year, all trim levels of the SRX received an infotainment system marketed as the "Cadillac User Experience" (CUE) as well as new safety features and active noise cancellation technology. Additional interior features included standard HD radio, Bluetooth audio streaming, additional USB ports, SD card slot and 12-volt outlet, revised headphone and remote design for rear seat entertainment, and revised shift knob, steering wheel, and instrument cluster. The front styling and faux fender vents were revised. Three new colors: Evolution Green Metallic, Glacier Blue Metallic and Silver Coast Metallic were added, and wheels options were revised.

==== 2014 changes ====
For the 2014 model year, 18-inch chrome wheels were added to the Luxury trim and the Driver Awareness package received Intellibeam headlights. Exterior colors Graphite Metallic, Terra Mocha Metallic, and Sapphire Blue Metallic were added, and caramel and ebony interior accents became options.

==== 2015 changes ====
The 2015 SRX added 4G LTE connection and a standard Wi-Fi hotspot. Exterior colors Cocoa Bronze Metallic and Majestic Plum Metallic were added.

==== 2016 changes ====
For the 2016 model year, Cadillac removed the Majestic Plum Metallic color.

=== Safety recall ===
In May 2010, General Motors recalled about 550 of its 2010 Cadillac SRXs with the turbocharged 2.8-liter V-6 because of a possible engine failure if owners use regular gas and drove aggressively. The automaker said the fuel-filler lid and owner's manual warn that the engine should not be worked hard if regular fuel is used. Failures in several vehicles owned by GM and one external user led it to discover that using regular fuel and driving hard could cause possible internal engine damage including connecting rod failures. The automaker decided to conduct a "customer satisfaction program" to recalibrate the engine computer, but the NHTSA considered engine failures to be a safety issue and argued that a recall was required. The 2.8 liter V6 was permanently removed from production after the 2010 model year due to safety recalls and poor sales. 3.0L V6 was the only engine option available for the 2011 model year. The 3.0L V6 was replaced by a 3.6L V6 engine for the 2012 model year as the only engine option available.

=== Safety ===
2016 Cadillac SRX SUV AWD NHTSA
Overall:	5/5 stars
Frontal Driver:	5/5 stars
Frontal Passenger:	4/5 stars
Side Driver:	5/5 stars
Side Passenger:	5/5 stars
Side Pole Driver:	4/5 stars
Rollover :	17.9%

IIHS:
Category	Rating
Moderate overlap frontal offset	Good
Side impact	Good
Roof strength	Good^{2}

^{1} vehicle structure rated "Good"
^{2} strength-to-weight ratio: 4.14

=== Engines and transmissions ===
Model years	Engine	Power, Torque@rpm	Transmission
2010–2011	3.0L V6	265 bhp (269 PS; 198 kW) @ 6950, 223 lb⋅ft (302 N⋅m) @ 5100	Hydra-Matic 6T70 6-speed automatic with Driver Shift Control
2010–2011	2.8L Turbo V6	300 bhp (304 PS; 224 kW) @ 5500, 295 lb⋅ft (400 N⋅m) @ 2000	Aisin Warner AF40 6-speed electronically controlled automatic with Driver Shift Control and Eco Mode
2012–2016	3.6L V6	308 bhp (312 PS; 230 kW), 260 lb⋅ft (353 N⋅m)	Hydra-Matic 6T70 6-speed automatic with Driver Shift Control

== Sales ==
Calendar year	United States	Global
2003	5,049	
2004	30,019	
2005	22,999	
2006	22,043	
2007	22,543	
2008	16,156	
2009	20,237	
2010	51,094	
2011	56,905	
2012	57,485	
2013	56,776	
2014	53,578	87,765
2015	68,850	99,397
2016	22,139	
2017	156	
