= General Motors Sigma platform =

GM Sigma platform
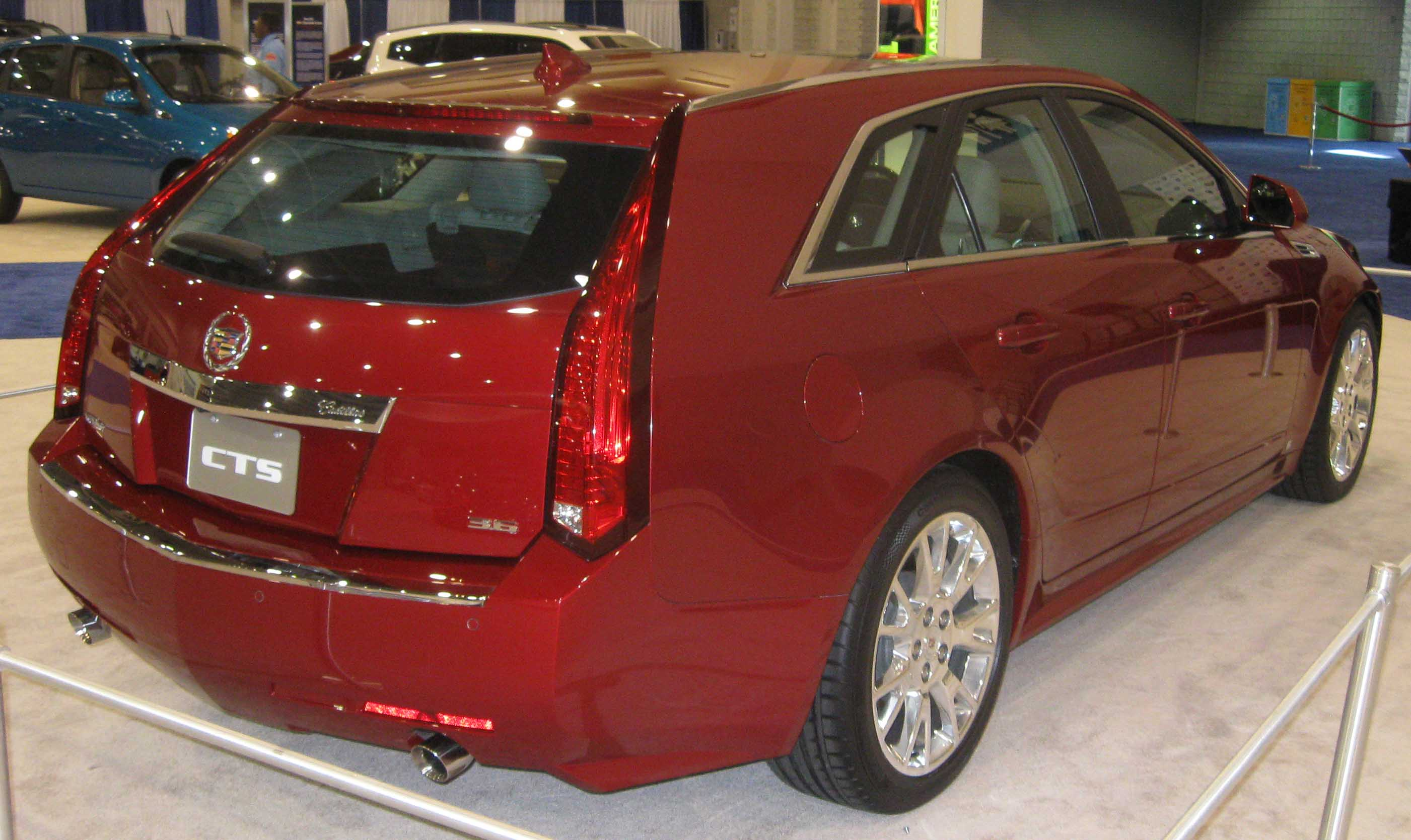
- 2010 Cadillac CTS Wagon

Overview
- Manufacturer: Cadillac
- Parent company: General Motors
- Production: 2002-2015
- Assembly: China: Shanghai (Shanghai GM); Russia: Kaliningrad, Kaliningrad Oblast (Avtotor); United States: Lansing, Michigan (Lansing Grand River)

Body and chassis
- Class: Mid-size car
- Layout: Front-engine, rear-wheel drive / all-wheel drive
- Body styles: 2-door coupé; 4-door sedan; 5-door station wagon; 5-door sport utility vehicle
- Vehicles: Cadillac CTS; Cadillac SRX; Cadillac STS
- Related: GM Zeta platform

Powertrain
- Engines: 2.6 L LY9 V6 (gasoline); 2.8 L LP1 V6 (gasoline); 3.0 L LF1 V6 (gasoline); 3.0 L LFW V6 (gasoline); 3.2 L LA3 V6 (gasoline); 3.6 L LY7 V6 (gasoline); 3.6 L LLT V6 (gasoline); 3.6 L LFX V6 (gasoline); 4.4 L LC3 V8 (supercharged gasoline); 4.6 L LH2 V8 (gasoline); 5.7 L LS6 V8 (gasoline); 6.0 L LS2 V8 (gasoline); 6.2 L LSA V8 (supercharged gasoline)
- Transmissions: 5-speed Getrag 260 manual; 5-speed GM 5L40-E automatic; 5-speed GM 5L50 automatic; 6-speed Aisin AY-6 manual; 6-speed GM 6L50 automatic; 6-speed GM 6L80 automatic; 6-speed GM 6L90 automatic; 6-speed Tremec T-56 manual; 6-speed Tremec TR-6060 manual

Dimensions
- Wheelbase: 113.4 in (2,880.4 mm); 116.4 in (2,956.6 mm)
- Length: 188.5–197.6 in (4,787.9–5,019.0 mm)
- Width: 70.6–74.1 in (1,793.2–1,882.1 mm)
- Height: 55.9–67.8 in (1,419.9–1,722.1 mm)
- Curb weight: 3,568–4,343 lb (1,618–1,970 kg)

Chronology
- Predecessor: GM V platform (RWD)
- Successor: GM Alpha platform

The General Motors Sigma platform is a mid-size automobile platform used by General Motors from the 2003 to 2015 model years. Exclusive to the Cadillac division, Sigma was the successor to the Opel-designed V platform. Initially developed for executive cars, the architecture was expanded for larger model lines, sports sedans, and multiple body styles.

Two generations of the Sigma platform were developed by GM for worldwide markets. The architecture was discontinued for the 2016 in favor of the GM Alpha platform, itself utilized nearly exclusively by Cadillac.

== Sigma I ==
The first Cadillac-exclusive platform since the D-body chassis, Sigma debuted in early 2002 for the 2003 model year underpinning the Cadillac CTS, replacing the Cadillac Catera. Slightly larger than its V-body predecessor, the rear-wheel drive Sigma architecture was developed to accommodate all-wheel drive and extended-wheelbase variants. For 2004, the Cadillac STS was introduced on the Sigma platform, replacing the Cadillac Seville. Sharing its wheelbase with the STS, the Cadillac SRX was introduced for 2005 as the second Cadillac SUV, slotted below the Escalade in size.

The Sigma platform uses four-wheel independent suspension with front control arms and a rear multi-link configuration. Initially powered by variants of the General Motors 54° V6 engine family, the platform introduced additional engines, including the High Feature V6 and Northstar V8. Exclusive to the high-performance CTS-V, the Sigma platform was developed to accommodate the 5.7L LS6 and 6.0L LS2 V8 engines of the Chevrolet Corvette. Outside of the CTS (which offered a standard 5-speed manual and a 6-speed manual for the CTS-V), all Sigma vehicles utilized GM 5-speed 5L40/5L50 automatic transmissions.

The Sigma architecture marked several firsts, as the CTS was the first Cadillac since the 1986 Cadillac Cimarron to be offered with a manual transmission. The 2004 STS became the first rear-wheel drive Cadillac sedan to offer the Northstar engine (originally developed for front-wheel drive applications). The China-market Cadillac SLS became the first non-limousine Cadillac sedan line introduced as an extended-wheelbase variant.

Vehicles based on this platform:

- 2003–2007 Cadillac CTS
- 2004–2009 Cadillac SRX
- 2005–2011 Cadillac STS
- 2007–2013 Cadillac SLS (China)

== Sigma II ==
GM debuted Sigma II with the 2008 Cadillac CTS. While sharing the previous 113.4-inch wheelbase, the platform was longer and wider than the previous generation. Remaining exclusive to the Cadillac division, the design adopted a greater degree of parts sharing with the Australian-designed Zeta platform. The High Feature engines were carried over to Sigma II, with the CTS-V receiving a supercharged LSA V8 (a variant of the Corvette ZR1 engine).

Sigma II became exclusive to the CTS, as the SRX was downsized for 2010, adopting the Theta Premium architecture and the STS was retired after 2011 (the SLS, 2013) with no direct successor.

For 2011, coupé and station wagon variants were introduced on the Sigma II platform (marking the first Cadillac coupe with a rear seat since the 2002 Eldorado).

Applications:

- 2008–2013 Cadillac CTS
- 2009–2015 Cadillac CTS-V

== See also ==
- List of General Motors platforms
