= Cadillac V series =

General Motors marque

- Product type: Performance engines and cars; Automotive sports accessories
- Current owner: Cadillac
- Produced by: General Motors
- Country: U.S.
- Introduced: 2003; 23 years ago

The Cadillac V series (stylized as V-Series) is a line of high-performance vehicles tuned by the General Motors Performance division for the Cadillac division of General Motors.

Introduced in 2003, the V-Series, along with its new 'Art & Science' design language, marked a concerted effort at Cadillac to initiate a brand resurgence, to address their high-performance competition and to attract a younger demographic. The first model was the 2004 Cadillac CTS-V, which itself became a successful seller and steered Cadillac in the new direction for the following decade.

Cadillac also participates in motorsport using the V series name. Their first V series race car was the CTS-V.R, a joint venture between GM Performance Division and Pratt & Miller race team, most famous for their role in GM's Le Mans-winning Corvette C5.R program. Three race cars have carried the V series name since then, most recently with the Cadillac V-Series.R sports prototype.

In 2009, the second-generation CTS-V sedan achieved a lap time of 7:59.32 at the Nürburgring Nordschleife, which was the fastest documented time for a production sedan on factory tires—until the Porsche Panamera Turbo clocked a time of 7:56 in July 2009—thanks to a heavily tuned "LS9" EATON-supercharged 6.2-liter (380 in^{3}) V8 engine that was borrowed from Corvette. The engine was renamed as "LSA" and it produces 556 horsepower and 551 pound-feet (747 N⋅m) of torque. The same "LSA" engine is used in the CTS-V coupe and wagon.

== Etymology of the "V" naming convention ==
In a 2018 interview, Bob Lutz, vice chairman at General Motors, acknowledged that the "V" naming convention followed careful market research, saying Cadillac “hired people for this and did research and such. We, of course, wanted to stay away from M, A, G, R or S and felt that 'V' was a unique and elegant letter." Given Cadillac's marked effort to develop models addressing their high performance (read: German) competition, signal a brand resurgence and draw a younger audience, Lutz said the V thus "could credibly stand for velocity or visceral."

It has been anecdotally noted that the letter "V" also recalls Cadillac's earlier logo, which featured a V-shape element below its crowned wreath.

== History ==
The V-Series development emerged from the mindset taken over at General Motors back in the late 1990s and early 2000s, when Cadillac was struggling against imports from Europe and Japan. GM was eager to bring Cadillac back to its mantra "Standard of the World" and the new 'Art & Science' design language that matured in the late nineties auto shows gave the brand an aggressive and edgy leap ahead that looked promising at that time.

The team assigned to create the first generation CTS recognized early on that a high-performance variant was necessary, not only to rival competition and display Cadillac's resurgence, but also to pull young and new customers to Cadillac.

The first-ever Cadillac V-Series was the CTS-V, which appeared in the movie The Matrix Reloaded.

== First-generation V series ==
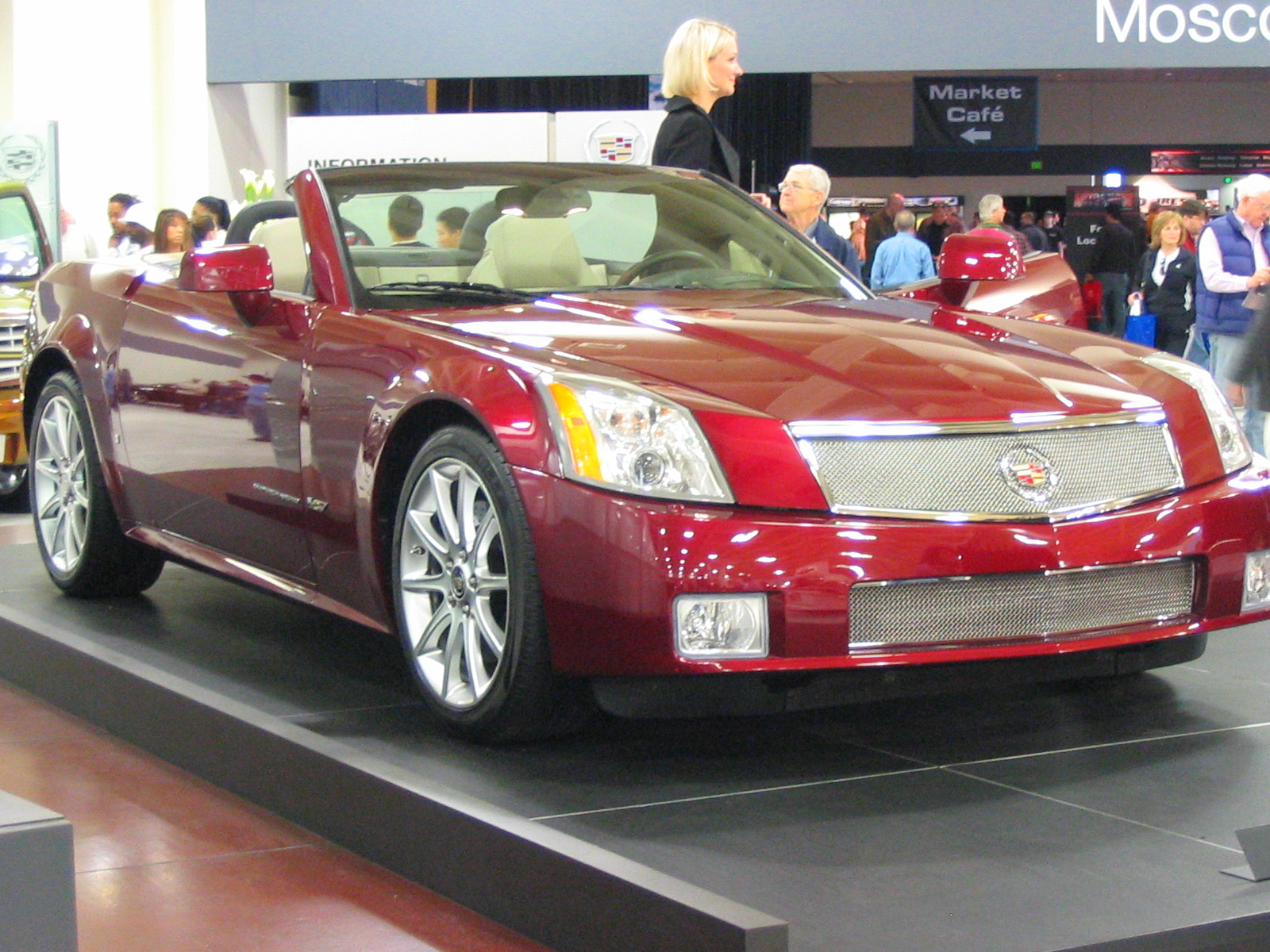
Cadillac XLR-V in 2005

The first V-series model of the Cadillac family was the CTS, which was built on the GM Sigma Platform like the core model but given the GM LS engine from the C5-generation Corvette Z06, along with a six-speed Tremec manual transmission. Since the LS was a V8 engine, it required a unique engine cradle distinct from the base CTS V6. Larger anti-roll bars and larger shocks were also added, and the spring rate was significantly increased.

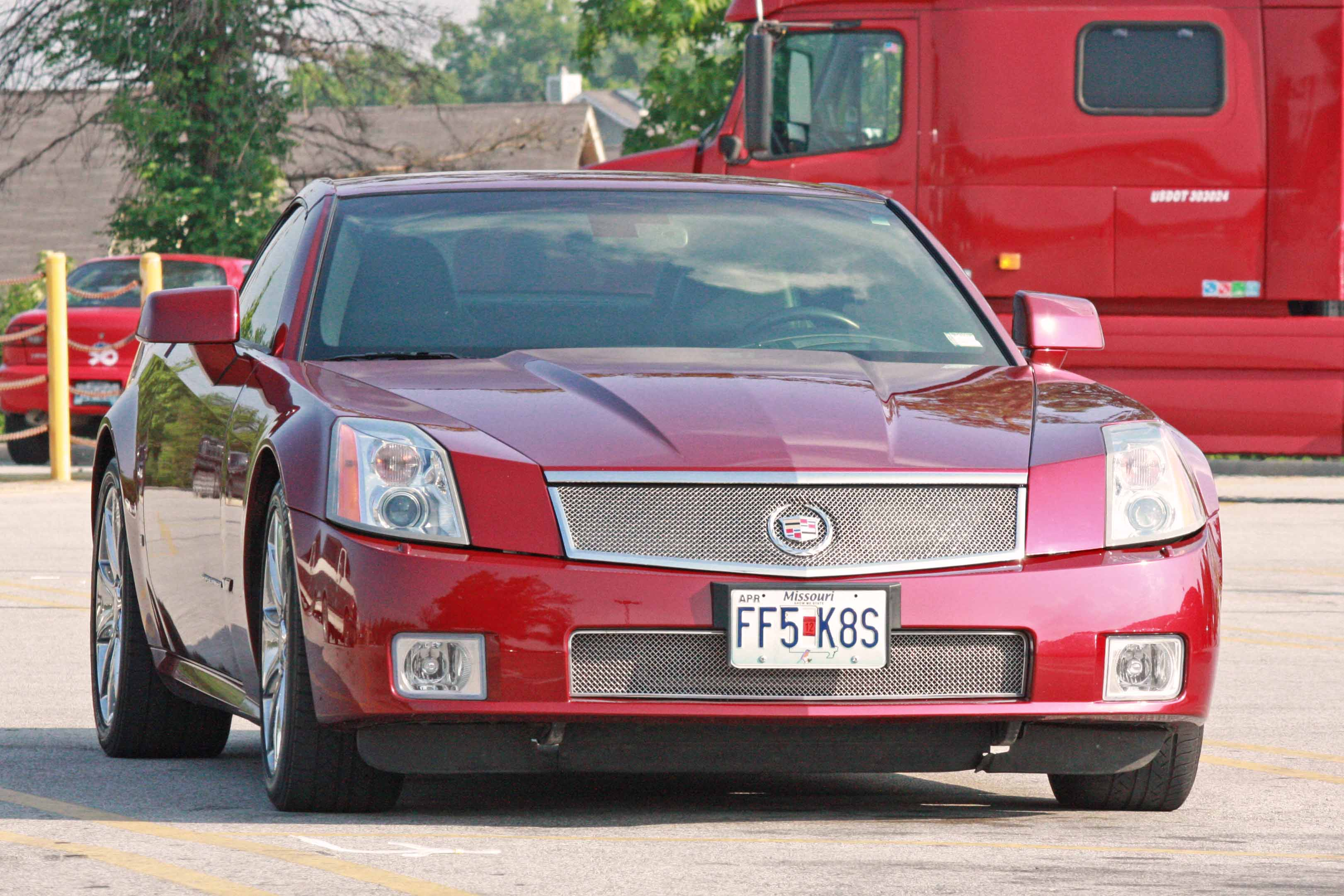
Cadillac XLR-V

The XLR hard-top followed in 2005, sharing its platform with the Chevrolet Corvette (C6). The XLR-V used a supercharged 4.4-liter (270 in^{3}) Northstar V8 which produced 443 hp (330 kW) and 414 lb·ft (561 N·m). The supercharger and four intercoolers were built into the intake manifold. A six-speed automatic transmission, larger brakes from the Z51 Corvette, and 19-inch wheels were used. The XLR base price was $98,000 and by 2008 it reached $101,300 making it one of General Motors' most expensive vehicles to that point.

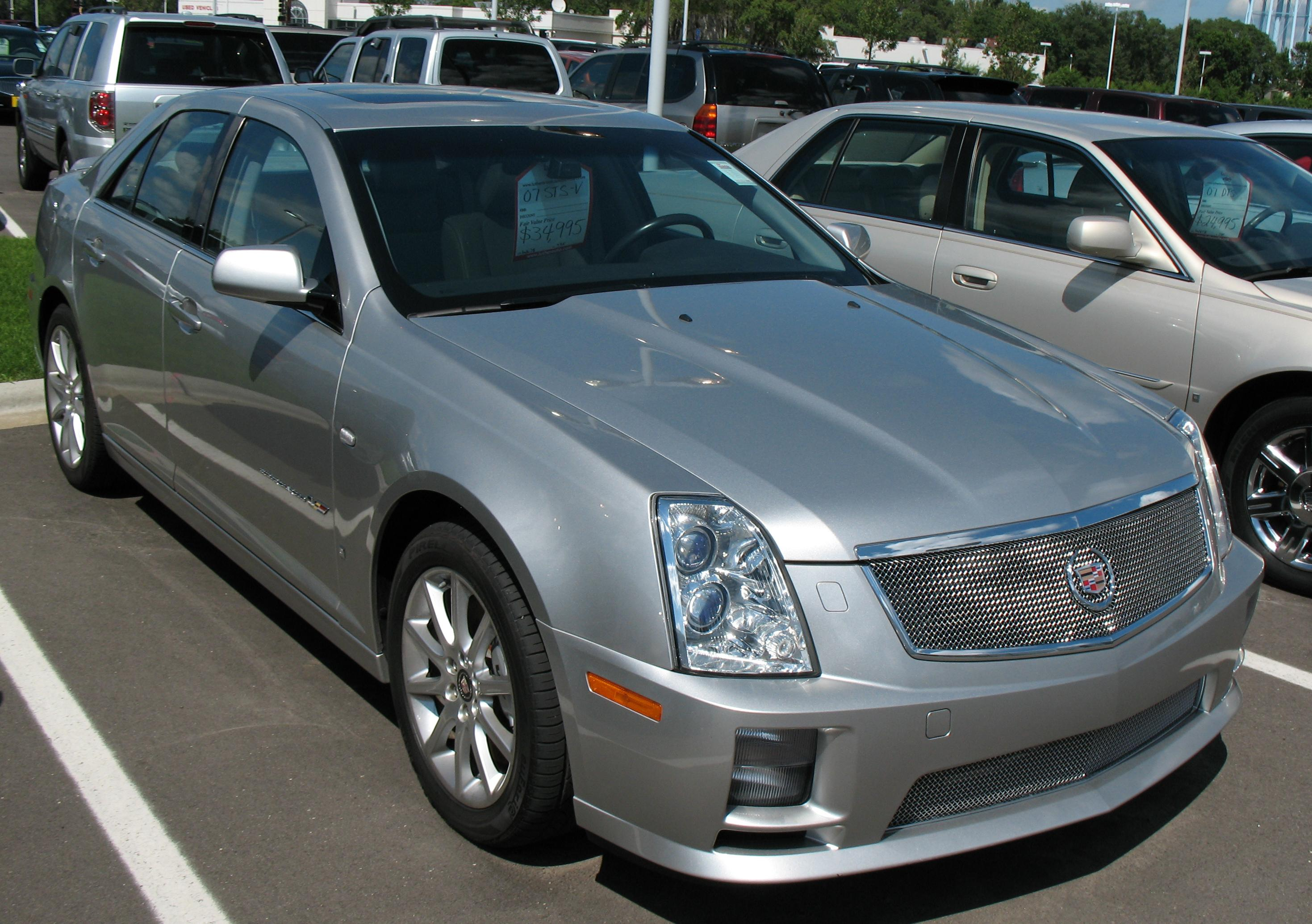
Cadillac STS-V

A year after the XLR-V launch and two after the CTS-V, in 2006, Cadillac started producing the STS-V sedan. Its 4.4-liter (270 in^{3}) XLR-V derived Northstar V8 produced 26 more horsepower and 25 more lb-ft of torque. The engine was mated to a driver-adjustable transmission with two shifting modes, larger Brembo brakes, larger ten-spoke alloy wheels (18 in × 8.5" front, 19 in × 9.5" rear), Pirelli run-flat tires, a faster steering ratio, and a stiffer suspension than the standard STS.

== Second-generation V series ==
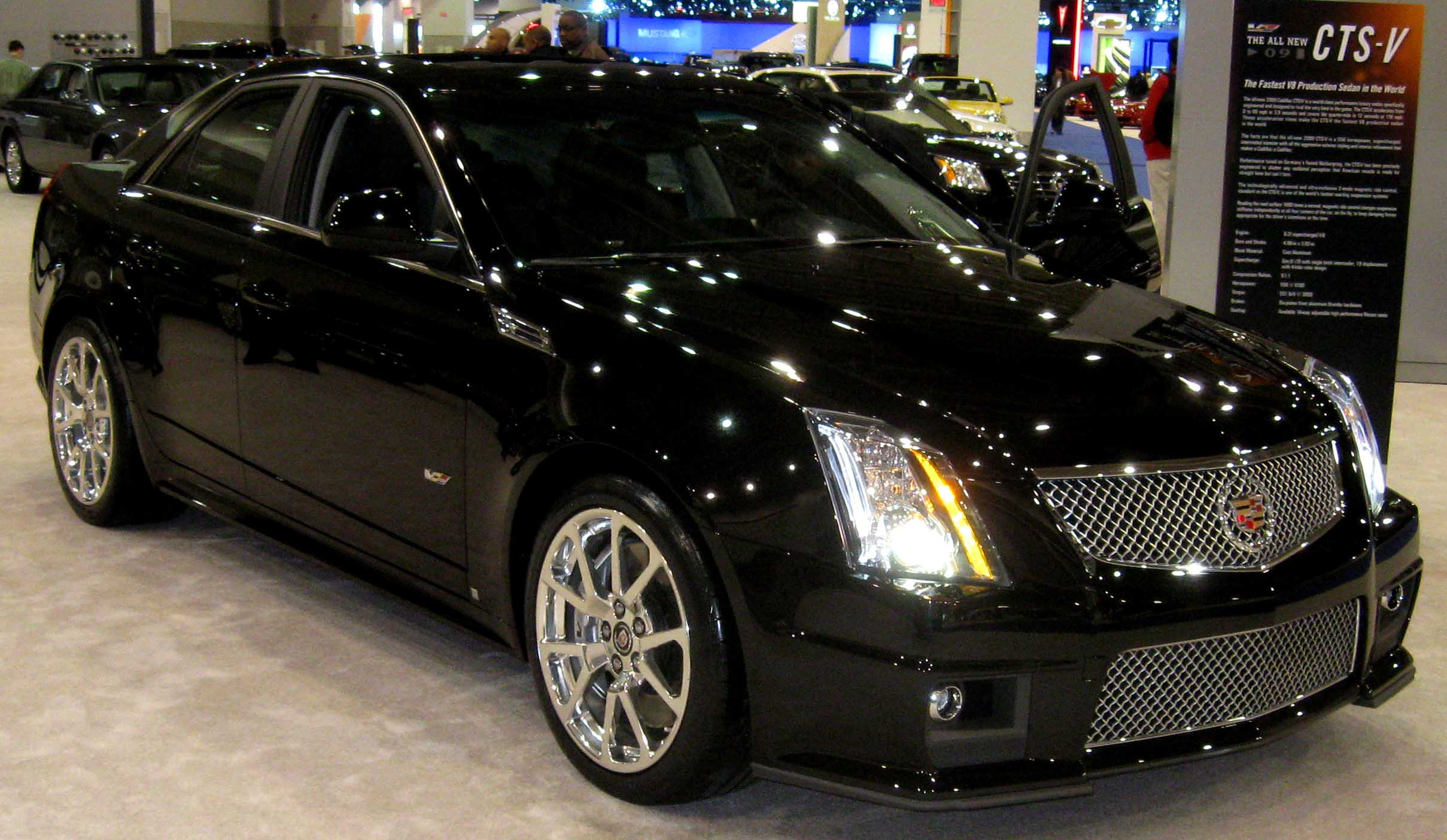
2nd generation Cadillac CTS-V sedan

The second-generation V series was exclusive to the CTS since the STS and XLR were rolled out of production. For 2009, Cadillac introduced the second-generation CTS-V that was built on the GM Sigma II Platform. It was a rear-wheel drive, powered by a 6.2-liter (380 in^{3}) LSA EATON-supercharged V8 that was based on the LS9 V8 from the then-recently released Corvette ZR1. The engine generates 556 horsepower and 551 lb-ft of torque. The second-generation CTS-V broke a Nürburgring lap record, which made it the then-fastest production sedan.

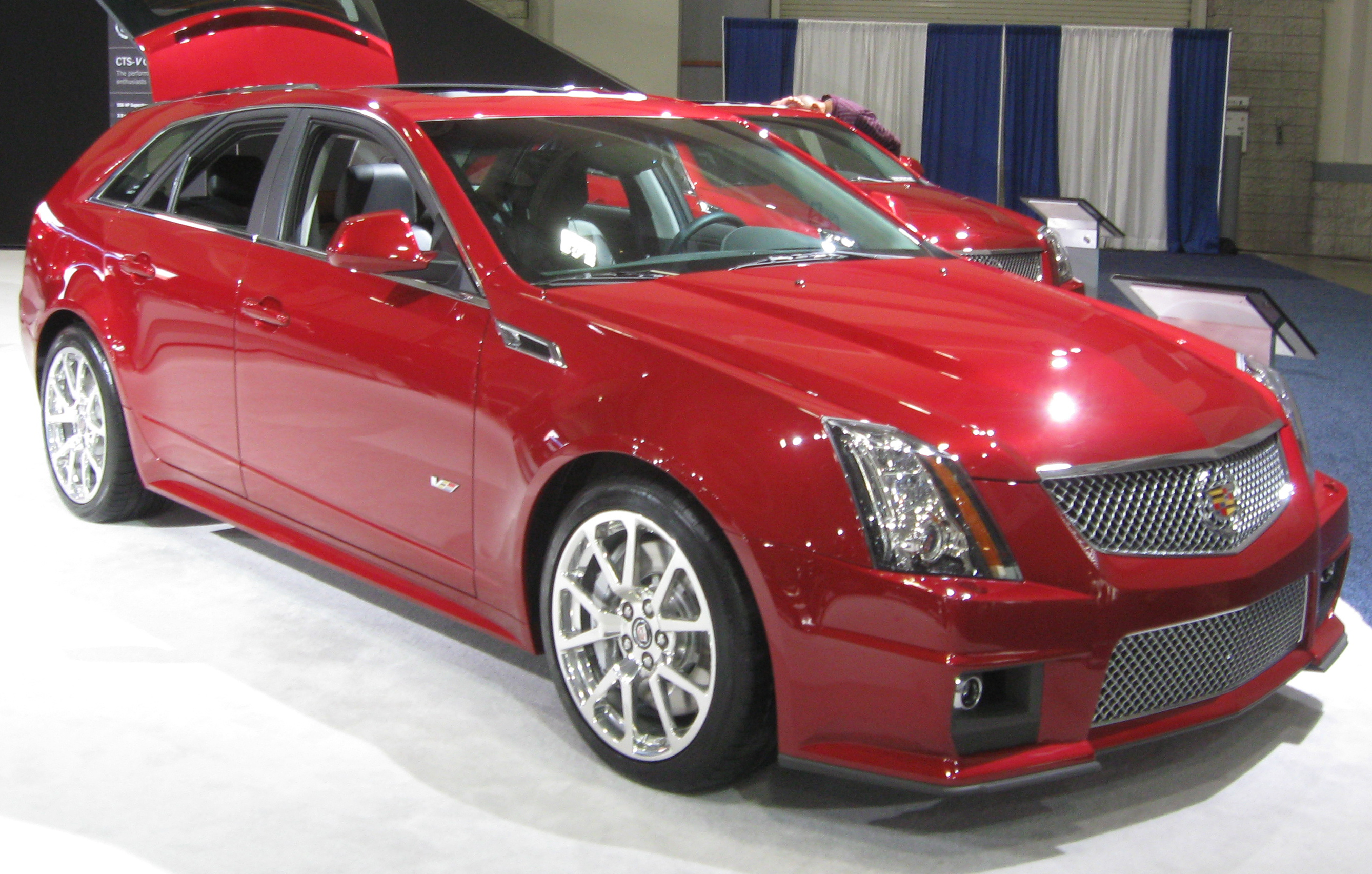
Second-generation Cadillac CTS-V wagon

When asked in 2009 about the possibility of a CTS-V wagon, the GM Vice Chairman at that time, Bob Lutz, replied, "... should sufficient demand materialize, there is no reason why we couldn't do a V-series wagon, and I would be standing in line for one, just ahead of you." GM decided to move forward, introducing a 5-door sport wagon body style to the CTS-V vehicle line at the New York International Auto Show on March 29, 2010.

The CTS-V wagon shares the 556 hp (415 kW) engine and six-speed manual or automatic transmission, Magnetic Ride Control, Brembo brakes, 19-inch aluminum wheels and performance tires and a dual-airflow grille also used in the CTS-V sedan and coupe.

The CTS-V coupe debuted at the 2010 North American International Auto Show in Detroit, and entered production in summer 2010 as a 2011 model. It has the same 556 hp (415 kW) engine and transmission choices as the CTS-V sedan. The CTS-V Coupe features unique centered twin exhausts, a larger grille for air intake, and an optional "saffron" interior trim color. Like the CTS-V sedan, it comes standard with 19-inch aluminum wheels, Brembo brakes, and Magnetic Ride Control.

=== CTS Vday ===
Released in China in 2012, the CTS Vday was a special edition commemorating Cadillac's 110th anniversary. The CTS Vday does not have any changes to its 3.0 V6.

== Third-generation V series ==
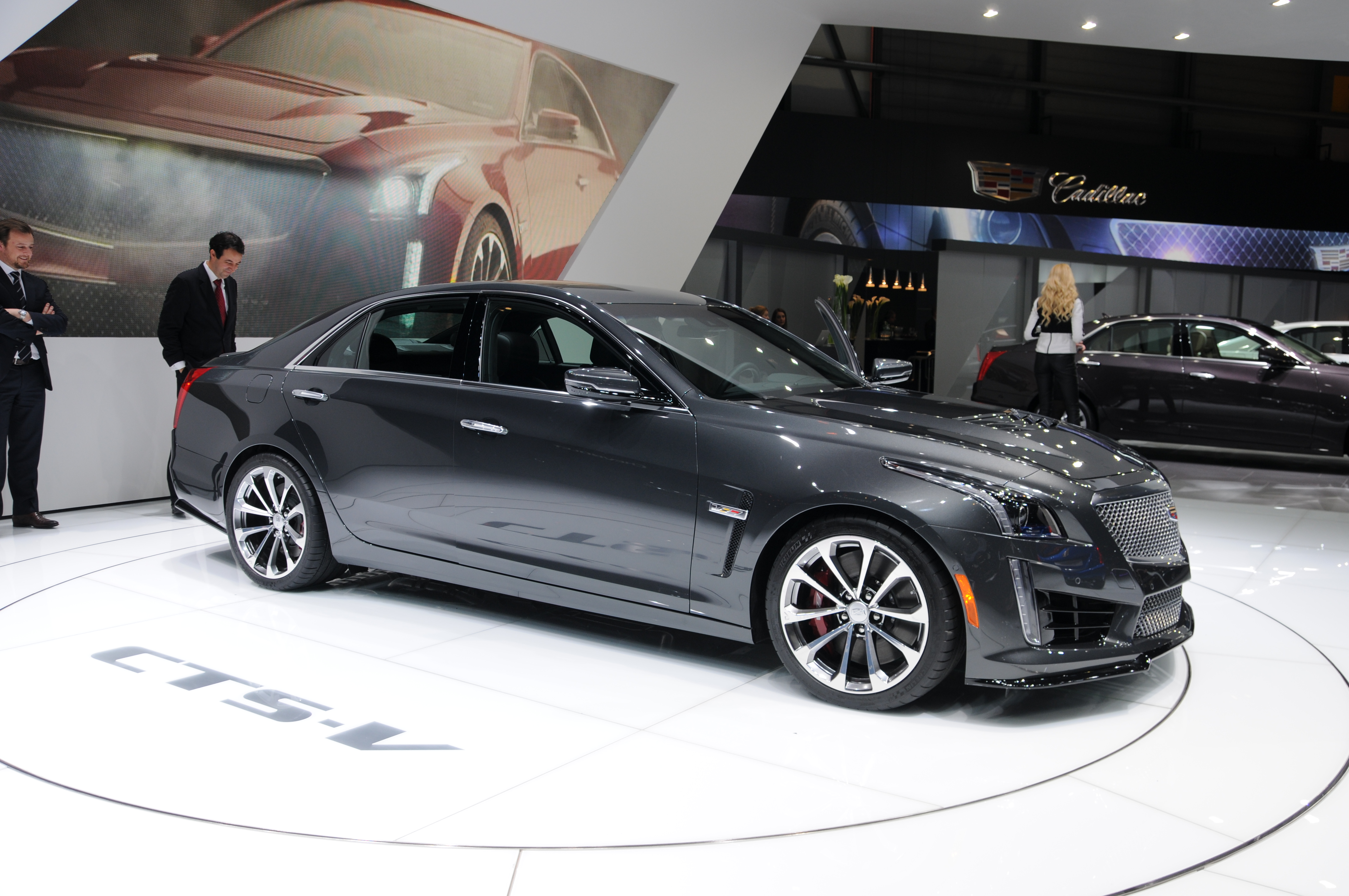
Third generation Cadillac CTS-V

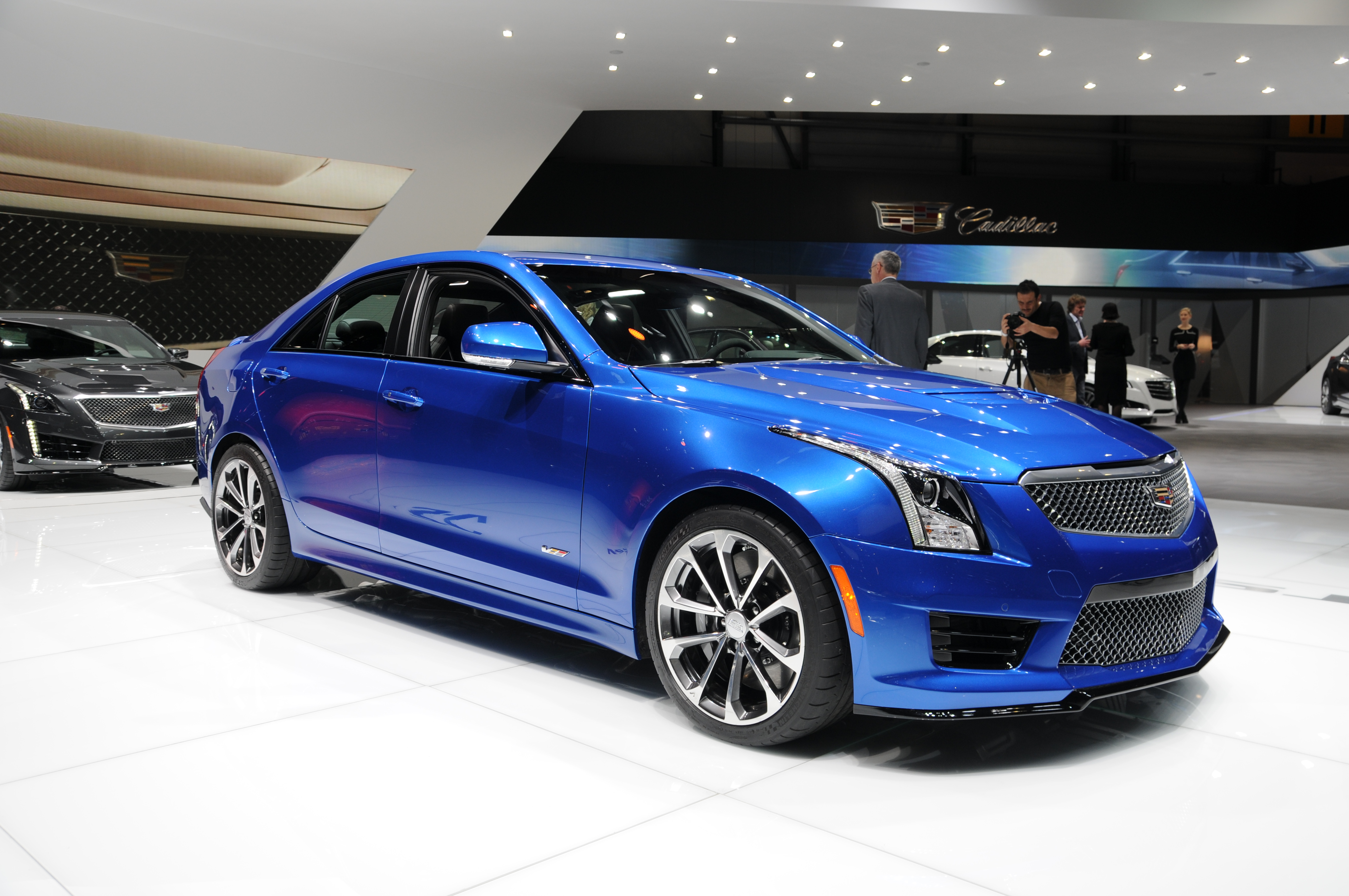
Cadillac ATS-V

The third-generation V series included the sub-brand's flagship, the CTS-V, and the compact ATS-V. Unlike the first and second generations, where the CTS-V was the biggest update for the V series, the third-generation was the first expansion attempt on the V brand by Cadillac. Typically, the V series served as Cadillac's top-of-the-line trim level, and that mainly was exclusive to the CTS since that's where it all started. However, with such buzz created by the second-generation V series, and the short-lived record for a sedan on a demanding racetrack, Cadillac wanted to build on that success with other models in their lineup. This led them to create the Vsport, where potential buyers interested in the V series could purchase a CTS with increased horsepower and sportier handling and bypass the 'comfort & luxury' trims by getting an entry-level 'performance' model for $20k less than the full-fledged CTS-V.

=== Vsport ===
Starting with the XTS, the marque offers a step trim called Vsport. The Vsport trim is the top of the XTS line, with a 3.6-liter turbocharged engine, producing 410 horsepower (310 kW). The next year, the third-generation CTS offered with a Vsport trimline, however with an increased output of 420 horsepower (310 kW). Both of them were the only "V"-badged vehicles of Cadillac until the CTS-V and ATS-V.

For the 2016 model year, the trim was rebranded as V-Sport. The V-Sport trim designation was discontinued with the CTS and XTS sedan phase-outs in 2019 and 2020, respectively.

=== CTS-V ===
The CTS-V was powered by a supercharged version of the Corvette (C7) 6.2-liter LT4 V8 engine found on the Z06. It generated 630 pound-feet (850 N⋅m) of torque and 640 horsepower (480 kW)—10 horsepower (7.5 kW) less than the Z06—making the third-generation CTS-V the most powerful Cadillac ever produced up until 2022 with the release of the CT5-V Blackwing. Weighing 4,145 pounds (1,880 kg), the CTS-V equipped with an 8-speed automatic transmission was able to do 0–60 miles per hour (0–97 km/h) at 3.6 seconds. The top speed is 200 miles per hour (320 km/h), earning the third-generation CTS-V the unofficial nickname "the four-door Corvette".

=== ATS-V Sedan and ATS-V Coupe ===
The Cadillac ATS-V sedan and coupe filled the gap left by the second-generation CTS-V. Cadillac made the first and second generation CTS smaller than BMW's 5-Series and larger than the 3-Series. However, with the third-generation CTS growing larger to match the size of the 5-Series, Cadillac armed the ATS-V with the LF4 twin-turbo V6 engine, producing 464 horsepower (346 kW) and 445 pound-feet (603 N⋅m). The ATS-V is the first-ever V series Cadillac to be powered by a V6 rather than a V8.

== Fourth-generation V series ==
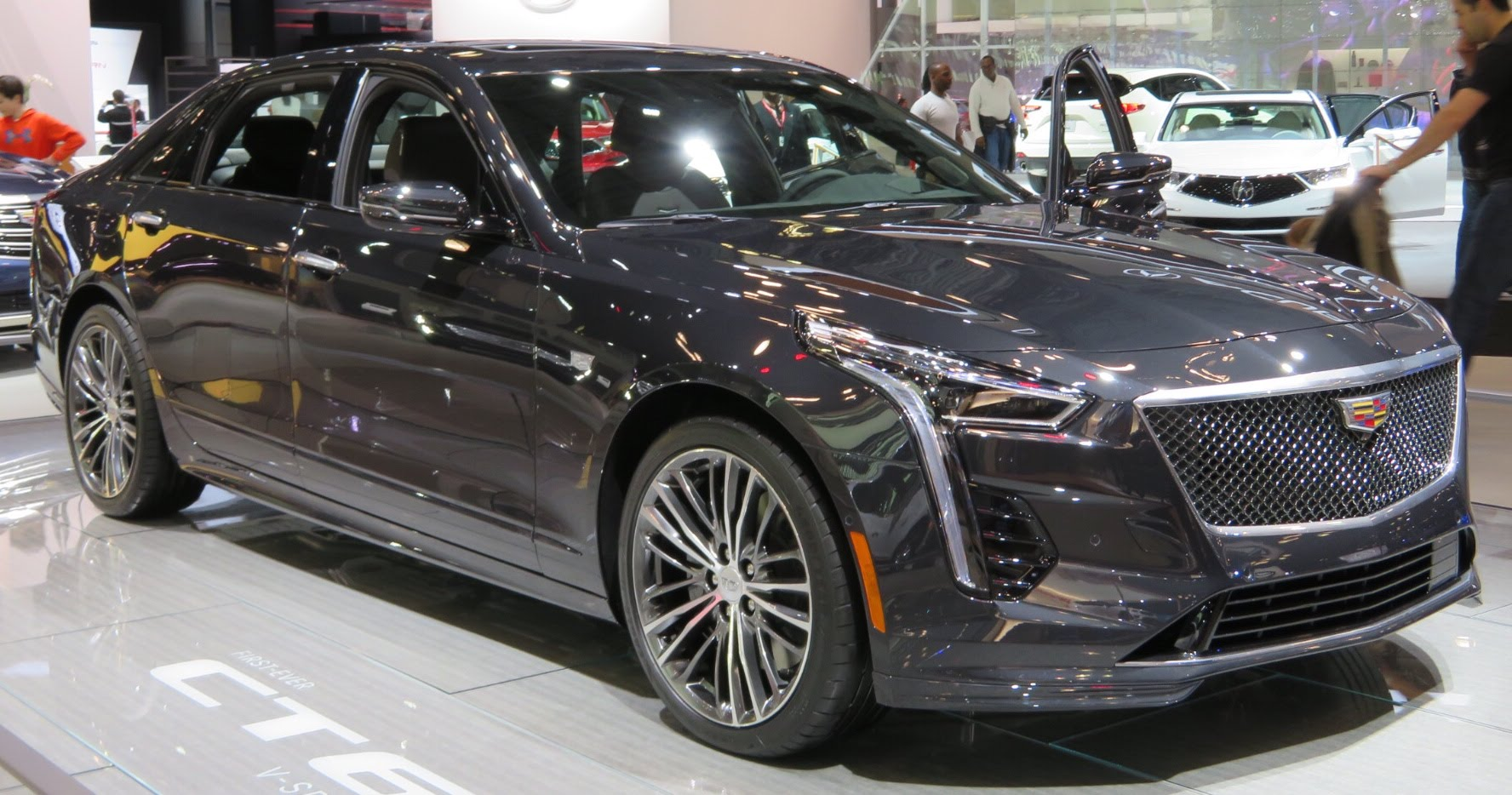
Pre-production Cadillac CT6 V-Sport, prior renaming to CT6-V

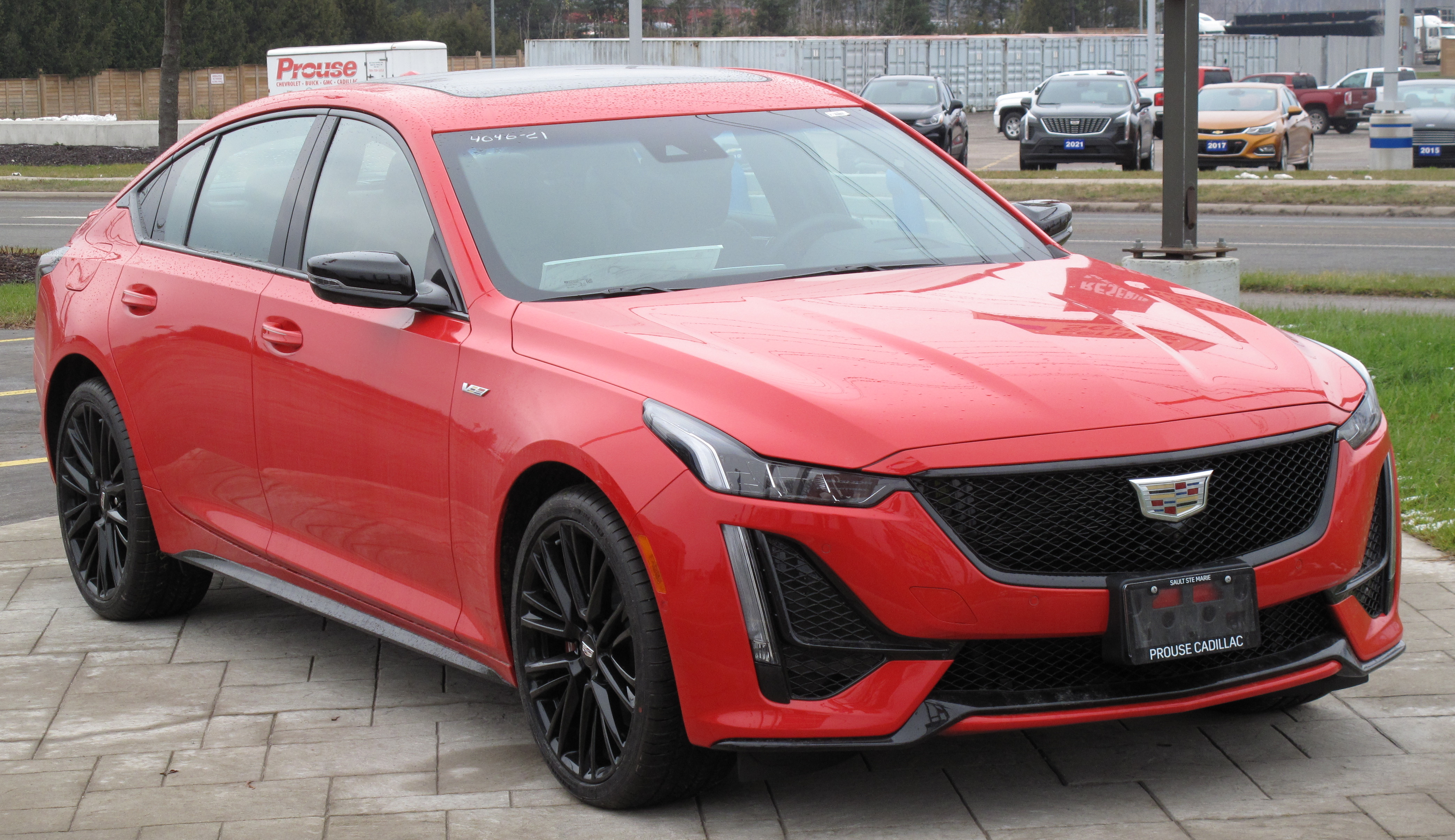
Cadillac CT5-V

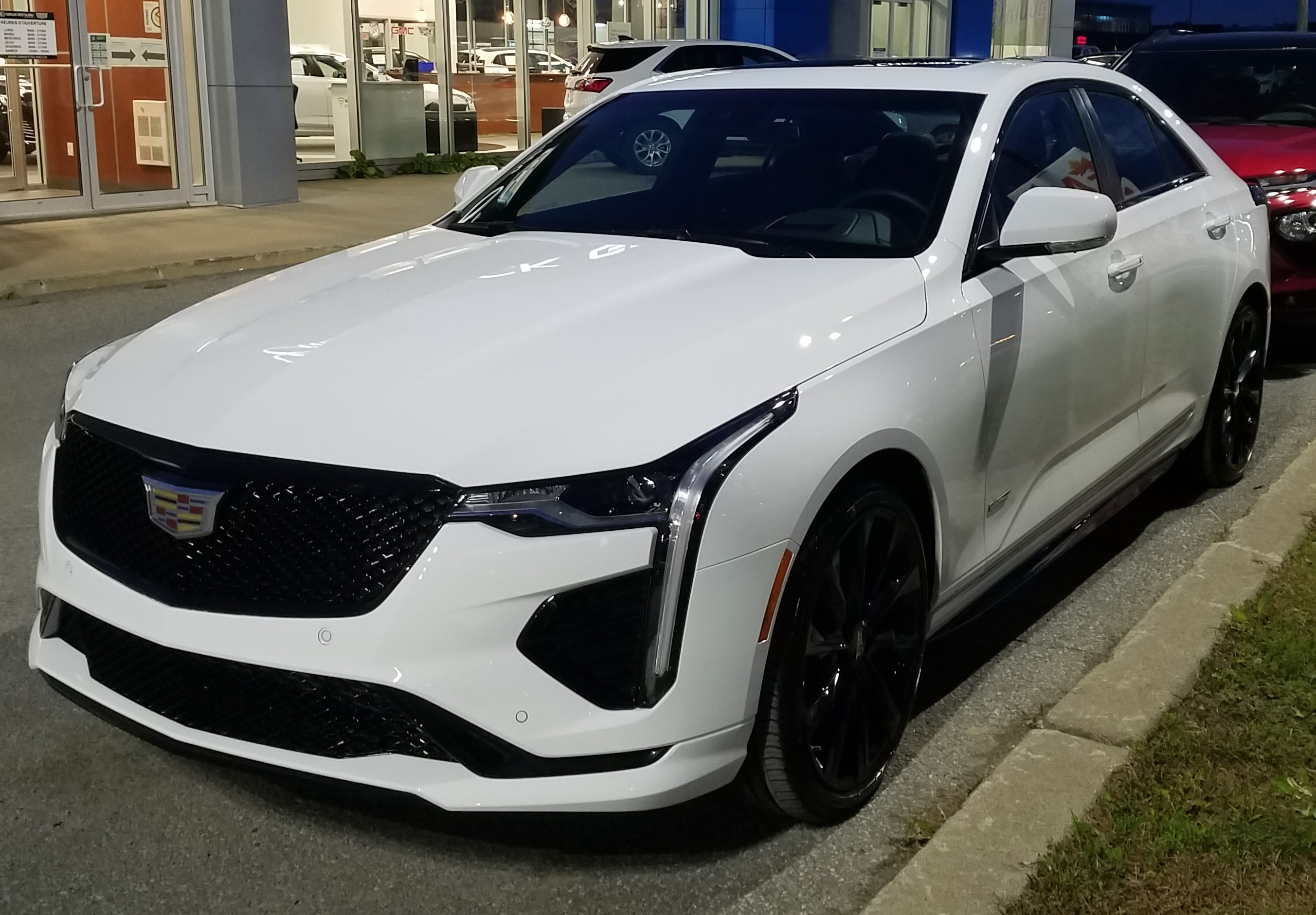
Cadillac CT4-V

The fourth-generation V series evolved away from "Art & Science" and ushered in Cadillac's new design language, beginning with the flagship CT6-V. Cadillac also restructured the V series with this generation. In place of the discontinued V-Sport introduced in the previous generation, Cadillac repositioned the V models as an entry-level performance variant (with CT6 V-Sport being renamed CT6-V right before launch), and introduced a new top-level V series trim dubbed "V Blackwing" (after the engine used in the CT6-V), taking the place of the previous generation V models (e.g. the CTS-V is directly replaced by the CT5-V Blackwing). This pushes the V models to serve as a mid-level trim in Cadillac's entire trim levels (even non-performance models) and features smaller engines rather than V8s. The move was aimed to make better use of the V series sub-brand and spread it into a price range of two categories instead of just one. Also new to the fourth-generation V series is the ability to add Cadillac's Platinum package for the first time on a V model.

=== CT6-V ===
The CT6-V served as a launch platform for Cadillac's hand-built 4.2-liter Blackwing twin-turbo V8, generating 550 horsepower (410 kW) and 640 pound-feet (870 N⋅m) of torque. The CT6-V also included all-wheel drive, making it the first V series ever to feature AWD, and the first Cadillac sedan ever to feature a V8 with AWD. The STS in its highest trim came with a Northstar V8 and AWD.

With the lightweight Omega Platform, active rear-wheel steering, and all-wheel drive, the CT6-V was designed for high performance. It was reported to be an agile and nimble full-size luxury sedan.

The CT6-V does 0–60 miles per hour (0–97 km/h) in 3.8 seconds, just 0.2 seconds more than the third-generation CTS-V.

Prior to official production and release, CT6s with the 550 hp Blackwing V8 were designated as V-Sport models. Upon official production the model designation was changed to "CT6-V". CT6s with the 500 hp Blackwing V8 were available as a standard option on the CT6 Platinum levels, and optional on Premium Luxury models for an extra fee on 2019 models.

=== CT5-V ===
The CT5-V replaced the CTS and is powered by the 3.0-liter LGY twin-turbo V6, generating 405 pound-feet (549 N⋅m), sent to the wheels via the new GM 10-Speed automatic transmission. The 360 hp CT5-V features Magnetic Ride Control and electronic limited-slip differential. The steering wheel includes a new button labeled "V-Mode", which activates driver-preset custom settings, such as the engine sounds, steering, suspension, powertrain, and brake response.

=== CT4-V ===
Taking over the lead from the ATS, the CT4-V features a 2.7-liter dual-volute high-output inline-4 turbo engine, generating 325 horsepower (242 kW) and 380 pound-feet (520 N⋅m). The CT4-V includes Magnetic Ride Control and Brembo brakes as standard. The same "V-Mode" button available in the CT5-V is also found in the CT4-V.

=== CT5-V Blackwing and CT4-V Blackwing ===
The 2022 CT5-V Blackwing was announced in February 2021 to have a 6.2-liter supercharged 668 hp pushrod V8 engine. The 2022 CT4-V Blackwing was announced at the same time, with a 472 hp twin-turbo 3.6-liter V6. The 2023 CT5-V Blackwing currently has a hand-built 6.2-liter supercharged 668-horsepower V8 engine, built in the Performance Build Center at General Motors' Corvette Bowling Green Assembly Plant.

=== Escalade-V ===
A high-performance version of the full-sized Cadillac Escalade SUV, the Escalade-V, was announced in late January 2022 for the 2023 model year. The Escalade-V is expected to have a supercharged LT4 V8, also used to power the CT5-V Blackwing sedan, both hand-built in the Performance Build Center at General Motors' Corvette Bowling Green Assembly Plant. More details will be released in the spring of 2022 and the car will start arriving on dealerships in the second half of 2022.

== Motorsports ==
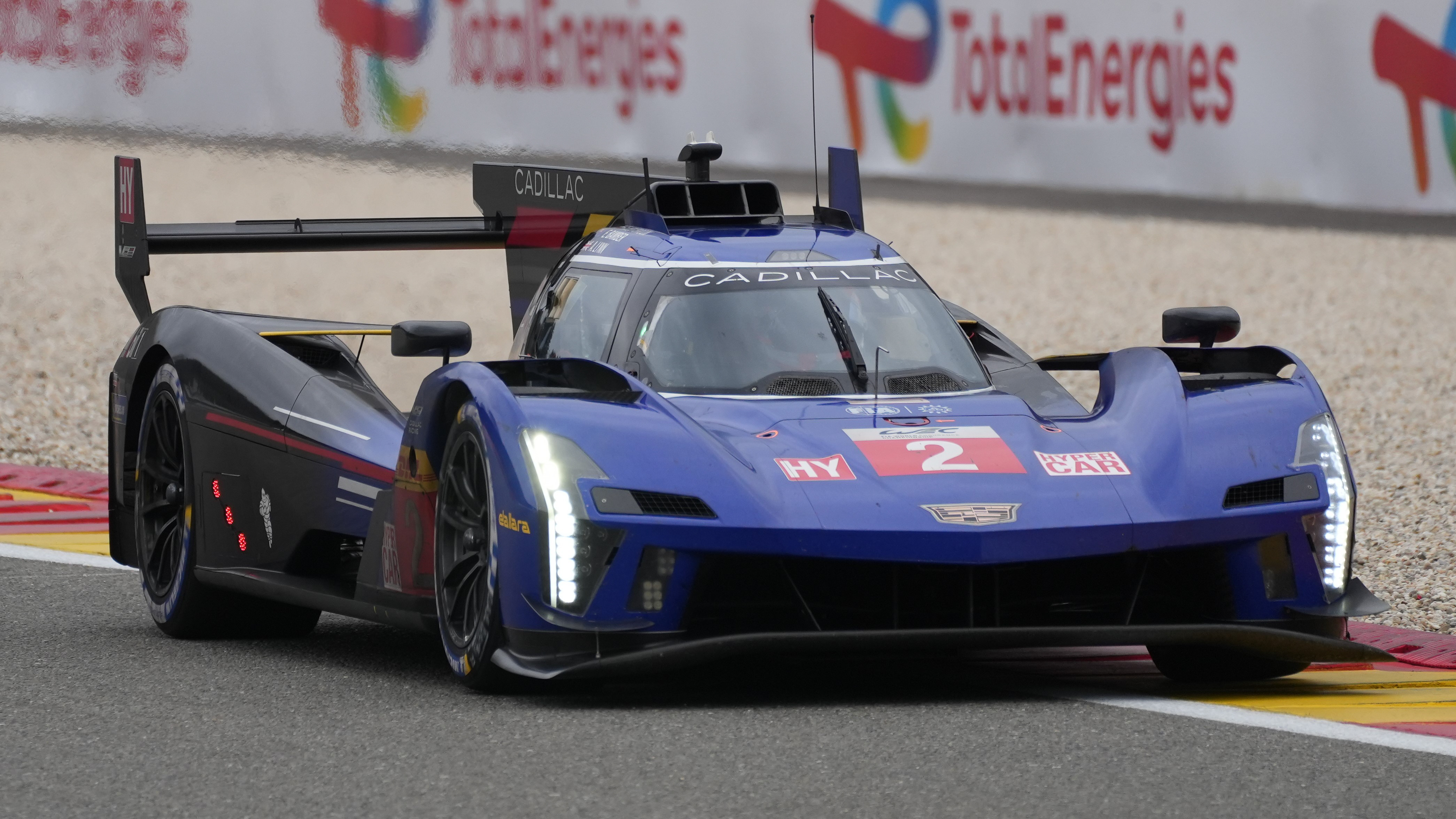
Cadillac V-Series.R at the 2023 6 Hours of Spa-Francorchamps.

Cadillac uses the V series name for its motorsport activities. Four race cars have carried the V series name so far, those being the Cadillac CTS-V.R, Cadillac ATS-V.R, Cadillac DPi-V.R, and Cadillac V-Series.R.

The earliest use of the V series name was in the 2011 Pirelli World Challenge, when the CTS-V.R made its debut, which marked Cadillac's return to the Pirelli World Challenge after a four-year absence. The ATS-V.R succeeded the CTS-V.R in the 2015 Pirelli World Challenge season. Between 2005 and 2015, Cadillac won five Drivers' and Manufacturers' Championships each with both cars.

Cadillac debuted the DPi-V.R in 2017 to compete in the IMSA SportsCar Championship, built to Daytona Prototype International (DPi) regulations. The DPi-V.R was Cadillac's first sports prototype in 15 years, since the Cadillac Northstar LMP series of sports cars from 2000 to 2002. The car's first win came in its debut season at the 2017 24 Hours of Daytona by Wayne Taylor Racing, followed by four more wins in a row. It won three Drivers' and Teams' Championships each during its tenure, courtesy of Wayne Taylor Racing and Action Express Racing.

The V-Series.R succeeded the DPi-V.R in 2023 as Cadillac's contender for the new Hypercar regulations for sports prototypes. The car was built under the LMDh regulations and uses a Dallara chassis. As of November 2024, the V-Series.R has four wins to its name and achieved 11 podium finishes and took the Teams', Drivers' and Manufacturers' Championships of the 2023 IMSA SportsCar Championship season. Cadillac also secured their first Le Mans pole position at the 2025 24 Hours of Le Mans with the V-Series.R, securing a front row lockout with Hertz Team Jota.
