= Cadillac SLS =

General Motors used the Cadillac SLS nameplate for the following vehicles:

- The fourth generation Cadillac Seville, produced from 1992 to 1997
- The fifth generation Cadillac Seville, produced from 1998 to 2004
- The first generation Cadillac STS, produced in China from 2006 to 2013
