= GM High Feature engine =

GM High Feature V6
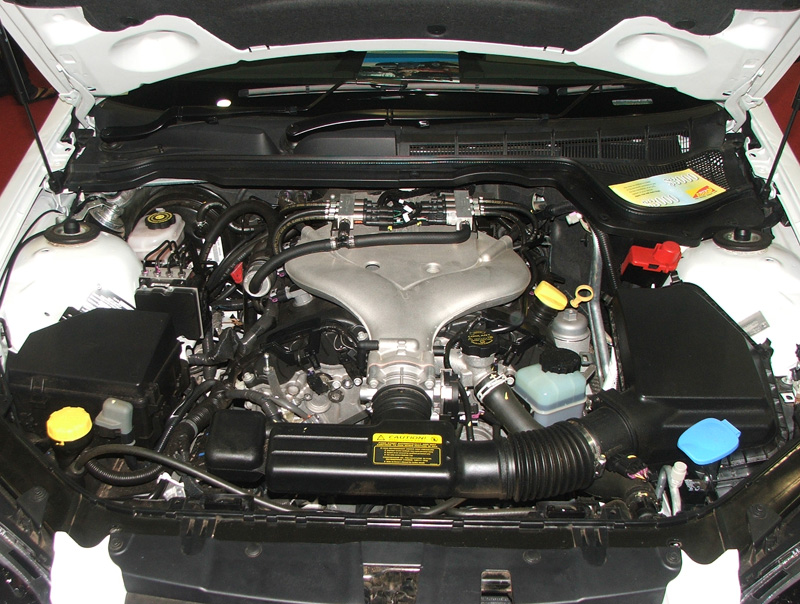
- Alloytec LPG V6 engine in a 2006-2008 Holden VE Commodore

Overview
- Manufacturer: General Motors
- Also called: Alloytec V6
- Production: 2004–present

Layout
- Configuration: 60° V6
- Displacement: 2,792 cc (2.8 L; 170.4 cu in); 2,994 cc (3.0 L; 182.7 cu in); 3,195 cc (3.2 L; 195.0 cu in); 3,564 cc (3.6 L; 217.5 cu in); 3,649 cc (3.6 L; 222.7 cu in)
- Cylinder bore: 86 mm (3.39 in); 89 mm (3.5 in); 94 mm (3.7 in); 95 mm (3.74 in)
- Piston stroke: 74.8 mm (2.94 in); 80.3 mm (3.16 in); 85.6 mm (3.37 in); 85.8 mm (3.38 in)
- Cylinder block material: Aluminum
- Cylinder head material: Aluminum
- Valvetrain: DOHC 4 valves × cyl. with VVT
- Compression ratio: 9.5:1, 10.0:1, 10.2:1, 10.3:1, 11.3:1, 11.5:1, 11.7:1, 12.2:1

RPM range
- Max. engine speed: 6500–7200

Combustion
- Turbocharger: Twin-turbo (in some models) Single-turbo (in the 2.8L LP9 and LAU)
- Fuel system: Sequential multi-port fuel injection Direct injection
- Fuel type: Gasoline, E85, LPG
- Oil system: Wet sump
- Cooling system: Water-cooled

Output
- Power output: 201–464 hp (150–346 kW; 204–470 PS)
- Torque output: 182–445 lb⋅ft (247–603 N⋅m)

Emissions
- Emissions target standard: Euro 6

Chronology
- Predecessor: Buick V6 engine; 54° V6; GM High Value engine; LX5 (Shortstar)

The GM High Feature engine (also known as the HFV6, and including the 3600 LY7 and derivative LP1) is a family of modern DOHC V6 engines produced by General Motors. The series was introduced in 2004 with the Cadillac CTS and the Holden VZ Commodore.

It is a 60° 24-valve design with aluminum block and heads and sequential multi-port fuel injection. Most versions feature continuously variable cam phasing on both intake and exhaust valves and electronic throttle control. Other features include piston oil-jet capability, forged and fillet rolled crankshaft, sinter forged connecting rods, a variable-length intake manifold, twin knock control sensors and coil-on-plug ignition. It was developed by the same international team responsible for the Ecotec, including the Opel engineers responsible for the 54° V6, with involvement with design and development engineering from Ricardo plc.

GM's Australian auto division Holden produced a HFV6 engine under the name "Alloytec."

== History ==
The HFV6 was designed, tested, and produced in a joint program by Holden and Cadillac. A majority of designs into the new alloy construction, transmission pairing, and first use in production were all undertaken in Detroit (and manufactured in St. Catharines, Ontario). Holden was charged with developing smaller engines (Holden 3.2 LP1 and Saab 2.8 Turbo LP9) as well as their own Holden 3.6 and 3.0 HFV6 (called the Alloytec V6) for local models.

Cadillac and Holden both tested variations of these engines in the United States and Australia.

== 2.8 ==
=== LP1 ===
A 2.8 L (2,792 cc) LP1 variant was introduced in the 2005 Cadillac CTS. It was also used on the Chinese 2008 CTS. It has a 89 mm × 74.8 mm (3.50 in × 2.94 in) bore and stroke, sequential multi-port fuel injection and a 10.0:1 compression ratio. The LP1 was built in St. Catharines, Ontario.

Applications:

Year(s)	Model	Power	Torque
2004–2006	Buick Royaum (China)	208 hp (155 kW; 211 PS) @ 6500 rpm	184 lb⋅ft (249 N⋅m) @ 3200 rpm
2007–2009	Buick Park Avenue (China)	201 hp (150 kW; 204 PS) @ 6500 rpm	195 lb⋅ft (264 N⋅m) @ 2600 rpm
2005–2007	Cadillac CTS	210 hp (157 kW; 213 PS) @ 6500 rpm	194 lb⋅ft (263 N⋅m) @ 3300 rpm
2008-2010	Cadillac CTS	210 hp (157 kW; 213 PS) @ 6800 rpm	182 lb⋅ft (247 N⋅m) @ 3600 rpm
2007–2009	Cadillac SLS (China)	209 hp (156 kW; 212 PS) @ 6500 rpm	194 lb⋅ft (263 N⋅m) @ 3300 rpm

=== LP9 ===
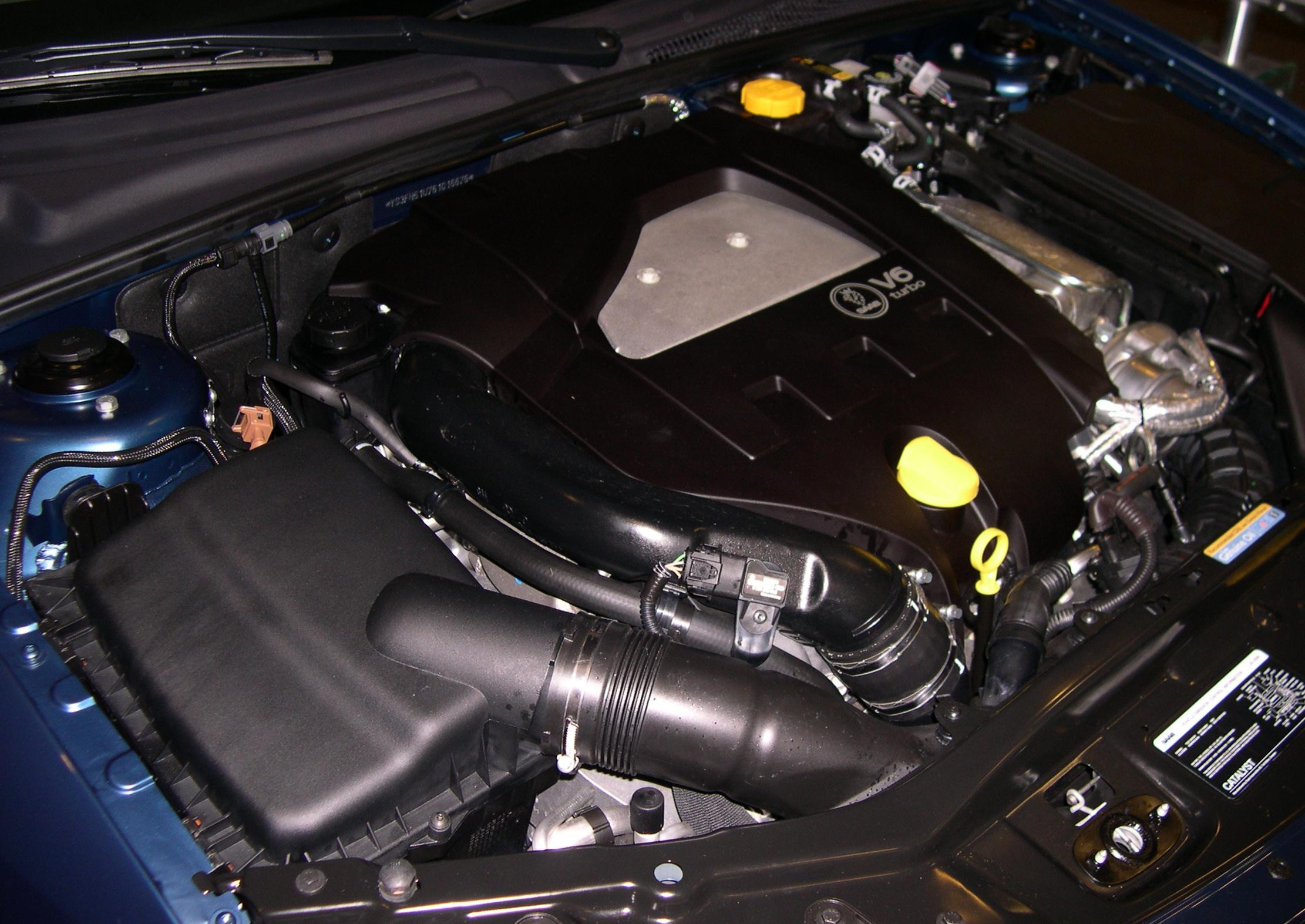
2.8 L turbo V6 in a 2006 Saab 9-3

This engine is also known as a A28NET, Z28NET, Z28NEL or B284.

The LP9 is a 2.8 L turbocharged version used for the Saab 9-3, Saab 9-5, and other GM vehicles. It has the same bore and stroke as the naturally aspirated LP1, however the compression ratio is reduced to 9.5:1. The engine is manufactured at Holden's Fishermans Bend engine factory in Port Melbourne, Australia, while GM Powertrain Sweden (formerly Saab Automobile Powertrain) is responsible for turbocharging the engine. Global versions of this engine use the same horsepower rating for both metric and imperial markets – mechanical horsepower – while the Europe-only versions are rated in metric horsepower.

Applications:

Year(s)	Model	Power	Torque
2005–2008	Opel/Vauxhall Vectra	227 hp (169 kW; 230 PS) @ 5500 rpm	330 N⋅m (243 lb⋅ft) @ 1900-4500 rpm
2005–2008	Opel/Vauxhall Signum	227 hp (169 kW; 230 PS) @ 5500 rpm	330 N⋅m (243 lb⋅ft) @ 1900-4500 rpm
2006–2008	Opel/Vauxhall Signum	247 hp (184 kW; 250 PS) @ 5500 rpm	350 N⋅m (258 lb⋅ft) @ 1900-4500 rpm
2005	Opel/Vauxhall Vectra OPC/VXR	247 hp (184 kW; 250 PS) @ 5500 rpm	350 N⋅m (258 lb⋅ft) @ 1900-4500 rpm
2006–2008	Opel/Vauxhall Vectra OPC/VXR	276 hp (206 kW; 280 PS) @ 5500 rpm	350 N⋅m (258 lb⋅ft) @ 1900-4500 rpm
2006–2009	Cadillac BLS	247 hp (184 kW; 250 PS) @ 5500 rpm	350 N⋅m (258 lb⋅ft) @ 1900-4500 rpm
2006–2008	Saab 9-3 Aero	247 hp (184 kW; 250 PS) @ 5500 rpm	350 N⋅m (258 lb⋅ft) @ 1900-4500 rpm
2009	Saab 9-3 Aero	276 hp (206 kW; 280 PS) @ 5500 rpm	400 N⋅m (295 lb⋅ft) @ 1900-4500 rpm
2008	Saab 9-3 Turbo X	276 hp (206 kW; 280 PS) @ 5500 rpm	400 N⋅m (295 lb⋅ft) @ 1900-4500 rpm
2008	Saab 9-3 Aero Convertible	252 hp (188 kW; 255 PS) @ 5500 rpm	350 N⋅m (258 lb⋅ft) @ 1900-4500 rpm
2009	Saab 9-3 Aero Convertible	276 hp (206 kW; 280 PS) @ 5500 rpm	370 N⋅m (273 lb⋅ft) @ 1900-4500 rpm

=== LAU ===
The LAU is GM's new code for the LP9 Turbo engine, its usage starting with the 2010 Cadillac SRX. In 2011, production of the Cadillac SRX with the LAU engine ceased, but the engine remained in use in the Saab 9-4X until 2012, when production of that model came to an end.

Applications:

Year(s)	Model	Power	Torque
2010–2011	Cadillac SRX	300 hp (224 kW; 304 PS) at 5500 rpm	295 lb⋅ft (400 N⋅m) at 2000 rpm
2011–2012	Saab 9-4X	300 hp (224 kW; 304 PS) at 5500 rpm	295 lb⋅ft (400 N⋅m) at 2000 rpm
2009–2013	Opel/Vauxhall Insignia V6 4x4	256 hp (191 kW; 260 PS) @ 5500 rpm	350 N⋅m (258 lb⋅ft) @ 1900–4500 rpm
2009–2013	Opel/Vauxhall Insignia OPC/VXR	321 hp (239 kW; 325 PS) @ 5250 rpm	435 N⋅m (321 lb⋅ft) @ 1900–4500 rpm
2010–2012	Saab 9-5 Turbo6 XWD /Aero	296 hp (221 kW; 300 PS) @ 5500 rpm	400 N⋅m (295 lb⋅ft) @ 2000 rpm

== 3.0 ==
=== LF1 ===
The LF1 is a 3.0-litre (2,994 cc) version with a bore and stroke of 89 mm × 80.3 mm (3.50 in × 3.16 in) produced between 2010 and 2014, equipped with spark ignition direct injection (SIDI) and a 11.7:1 compression ratio.

Applications:

Year(s)	Model	Power	Torque
2010	Buick LaCrosse	255 hp (190 kW; 259 PS) @ 6950 rpm	217 lb⋅ft (294 N⋅m) @ 5600 rpm
2010–2012	Buick Park Avenue (China)	251 hp (187 kW; 254 PS) @ 6700 rpm	218 lb⋅ft (296 N⋅m) @ 2900 rpm
2010–2011	Cadillac CTS	270 hp (201 kW; 274 PS) @ 7000 rpm	223 lb⋅ft (302 N⋅m) @ 5700 rpm
2011–2013	Cadillac SLS (China)	268 hp (200 kW; 272 PS) @ 7000 rpm	221 ft⋅lb (300 N⋅m) @ 5600 rpm
2010–2011	Cadillac SRX	265 hp (198 kW; 269 PS) @ 6950 rpm	223 lb⋅ft (302 N⋅m) @ 5100 rpm
2011	Saab 9-4X	265 hp (198 kW; 269 PS) @ 6950 rpm	223 lb⋅ft (302 N⋅m) @ 5100 rpm
2010–2012	Chevrolet Equinox	264 hp (197 kW; 268 PS) @ 6950 rpm	222 lb⋅ft (301 N⋅m) @ 5100 rpm
2010–2012	GMC Terrain	264 hp (197 kW; 268 PS) @ 6950 rpm	222 lb⋅ft (301 N⋅m) @ 5100 rpm
2010	Holden VE Commodore	255 hp (190 kW; 259 PS) @ 6700 rpm	214 lb⋅ft (290 N⋅m) @ 2900 rpm
2011-2012	Opel Antara	255 hp (190 kW; 259 PS) @ 6900 rpm	-
2011	Chevrolet Captiva	255 hp (190 kW; 259 PS) @ 6900 rpm	212 lb⋅ft (287 N⋅m) @ 5800 rpm
2012	Chevrolet Malibu (Middle East)	260 hp (194 kW; 264 PS) @ 6900 rpm	214 lb⋅ft (290 N⋅m) @ 5600 rpm

=== LFW ===
The LFW is a flexible fuel version of the LF1, capable of running on E85, gasoline, or any mixture of the two. Output is identical to the LF1.

Applications:

Year(s)	Model	Power	Torque
2010–2017	Holden VE Commodore and Holden VF Commodore	254 hp (189 kW; 258 PS) @ 6800 rpm	214 lb⋅ft (290 N⋅m) @ 5200 rpm
2010–2016	Buick GL8 (China only)	254 hp (189 kW; 258 PS) @ 6800 rpm	214 lb⋅ft (290 N⋅m) @ 5200 rpm
2011–2012	Chevrolet Equinox	264 hp (197 kW; 268 PS) @ 6950 rpm	222 lb⋅ft (301 N⋅m) @ 5100 rpm
2011–2012	GMC Terrain	264 hp (197 kW; 268 PS) @ 6950 rpm	222 lb⋅ft (301 N⋅m) @ 5100 rpm
2012–2013	Chevrolet Captiva Sport	264 hp (197 kW; 268 PS) @ 6950 rpm	222 lb⋅ft (301 N⋅m) @ 5100 rpm
2012–2013	Cadillac CTS	270 hp (201 kW; 274 PS) @ 7000 rpm	223 lb⋅ft (302 N⋅m) @ 5700 rpm

== 3.2 ==
Holden has built its own 3.2 L (3,195 cc) version of the High Feature engine in Australia produced between 2005 and 2010 with a bore and stroke of 89 mm × 85.6 mm (3.50 in × 3.37 in). Branded with the Alloytec name like the 3.6 L version, this version produces 227 hp (169 kW; 230 PS) at 6600 rpm and 297 N⋅m (219 lb⋅ft) at 3200 rpm. It has a 10.3:1 compression ratio. Its fuel economy is 4–6 km/L (11–17 mpg_{‑imp}; 9.4–14.1 mpg_{‑US}) in city, and 7–9 km/L (20–25 mpg_{‑imp}; 16–21 mpg_{‑US}) on highway.. Holden also produced the 3.2 L engines that were used by Alfa Romeo as the basis of its JTS V6 engine.

Applications:

- 2006-2010 Daewoo Winstorm / Chevrolet Captiva / Holden Captiva
- 2006-2010 Opel Antara / Daewoo Winstorm MaXX / Holden Captiva MaXX
- 2008-2012 Suzuki Grand Vitara

== 3.6 ==
3.6
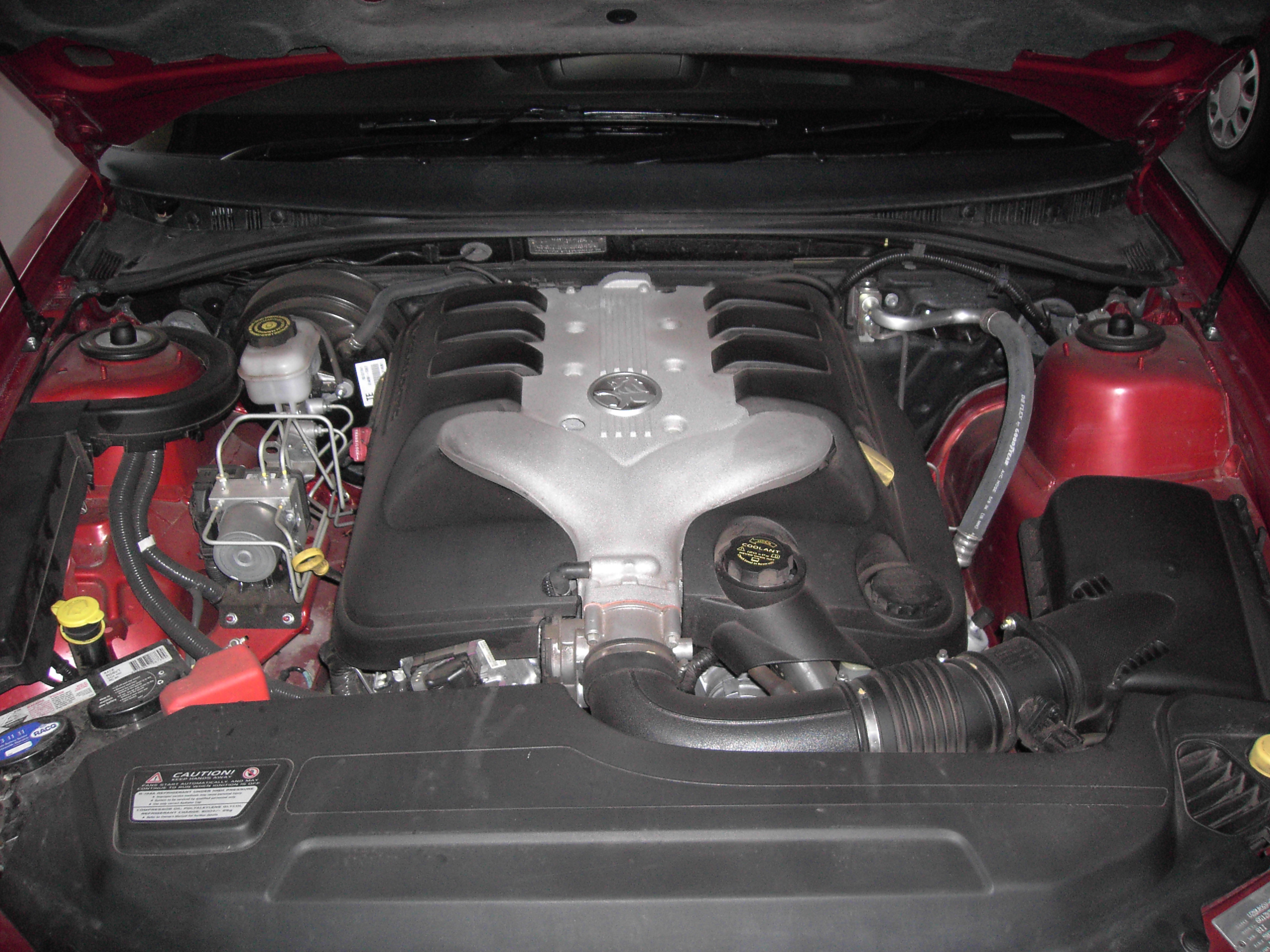
- 3.6L engine in a Holden VZ Commodore

Overview
- Production: 2004–present

Layout
- Displacement: 3,564 cc (3.564 L)
- Cylinder bore: 94 mm (3.70 in)
- Piston stroke: 85.6 mm (3.37 in)
- Compression ratio: 10.2:1, 11.3:1, 11.5:1

Combustion
- Fuel system: Sequential multi-port fuel injection; Direct injection
- Fuel type: Gasoline, Autogas (LPG), E85

Dimensions
- Dry weight: 168 kg (370 lb) (3.6L V6 High Feature engine)

=== LY7 ===
The 3.6 L; 217.5 cu in (3,564 cc) LY7 engine was developed primarily by Holden and introduced in the 2004 Holden VZ Commodore and 2004 Cadillac CTS sedan. It has a 10.2:1 compression ratio, sequential multi-port fuel injection, and a bore and stroke of 94 mm × 85.6 mm (3.70 in × 3.37 in). Lower-powered versions only have variable cam phasing on the inlet cam (LE0). Selected models also include variable exhaust. The engine weighs 370 lb (170 kg) as installed.

This engine was produced in several locations: St. Catharines (Ontario), Flint Engine South (Michigan), Melbourne (Australia), Ramos Arizpe (Mexico), and Sagara (Japan) by Suzuki.

Suzuki's engine designation is N36A.

The dual-fuel 235 hp (175 kW; 238 PS) LW2 version was able to run on petrol and autogas. The LW2 engine was based on the low-output LE0 V6. It featured a factory-fitted dual-fuel system developed by IMPCO, different valves, and hardened titanium valve seats. This motor was available exclusively in Holden vehicles from 2005 to 2012.

Applications:

Year(s)	Model	Power	Torque
2004–2007	Buick Rendezvous CXL/Ultra	242 hp (180 kW; 245 PS) @ 6000 rpm	232 lb⋅ft (315 N⋅m) @ 3500 rpm
2004–2007	Cadillac CTS	255 hp (190 kW; 259 PS) @ 6200 rpm	252 lb⋅ft (342 N⋅m) @ 2800 rpm
2008–2009	Cadillac CTS	263 hp (196 kW; 267 PS) @ 6200 rpm	253 lb⋅ft (343 N⋅m) @ 3100 rpm
2004–2005	Holden VZ Commodore	235 hp (175 kW; 238 PS) @ 6000 rpm	236 lb⋅ft (320 N⋅m) @ 2800 rpm
2006–2007	Holden VZ Commodore	231 hp (172 kW; 234 PS) @ 6000 rpm	236 lb⋅ft (320 N⋅m) @ 2800 rpm
2004–2009	Cadillac SRX	255 hp (190 kW; 259 PS) @ 6500 rpm	254 lb⋅ft (344 N⋅m) @ 2800 rpm
2004–2006	Holden VZ Commodore Holden WL Statesman, VZ Calais, VZ SV6	255 hp (190 kW; 259 PS) @ 6500 rpm	251 lb⋅ft (340 N⋅m) @ 3200 rpm
2006–2007	Holden VZ Commodore Holden WL Statesman, VZ Calais, VZ SV6	255 hp (190 kW; 259 PS) @ 6500 rpm	247 lb⋅ft (335 N⋅m) @ 3200 rpm
2005–2007	Cadillac STS	255 hp (190 kW; 259 PS) @ 6500 rpm	252 lb⋅ft (342 N⋅m) @ 3200 rpm
2005–2008	Buick LaCrosse CXS	240 hp (179 kW; 243 PS) @ 6000 rpm	225 lb⋅ft (305 N⋅m) @ 2000 rpm
2006–2007	Holden VE Commodore Omega	240 hp (179 kW; 243 PS) @ 6000 rpm	243 lb⋅ft (329 N⋅m) @ 2600 rpm
2008–2009	Holden VE Commodore Omega	235 hp (175 kW; 238 PS) @ 6500 rpm	240 lb⋅ft (325 N⋅m) @ 2400 rpm
2006–2011	Holden Rodeo/Colorado	211 hp (157 kW; 214 PS) @ 6500 rpm	231 lb⋅ft (313 N⋅m) @ 2600 rpm
2006–2009	Holden WM Statesman/Caprice	262 hp (195 kW; 266 PS) @ 6500 rpm	250 lb⋅ft (339 N⋅m) @ 2600 rpm
2007–2009	Buick Park Avenue (China)	255 hp (190 kW; 259 PS) @ 6600 rpm	250 lb⋅ft (339 N⋅m) @ 2800 rpm
2007–2009	Cadillac SLS (China)	251 hp (187 kW; 254 PS) @ 6500 rpm	252 lb⋅ft (342 N⋅m) @ 3200 rpm
2007	Pontiac G6 GTP	252 hp (188 kW; 255 PS) @ 6300 rpm	251 lb⋅ft (340 N⋅m) @ 3200 rpm
2007–2009	Saturn Aura XR	252 hp (188 kW; 255 PS) @ 6300 rpm	251 lb⋅ft (340 N⋅m) @ 3200 rpm
2008–2012	Chevrolet Malibu	252 hp (188 kW; 255 PS) @ 6300 rpm	251 lb⋅ft (340 N⋅m) @ 3200 rpm
2008–2009	Pontiac G6 GXP	252 hp (188 kW; 255 PS) @ 6300 rpm	251 lb⋅ft (340 N⋅m) @ 3200 rpm
2007–2008	Saturn Outlook XE single exhaust	270 hp (201 kW; 274 PS) @ 6600 rpm	248 lb⋅ft (336 N⋅m) @ 3200 rpm
2007–2008	Saturn Outlook XR dual exhaust	275 hp (205 kW; 279 PS) @ 6600 rpm	251 lb⋅ft (340 N⋅m) @ 3200 rpm
2007–2008	GMC Acadia	275 hp (205 kW; 279 PS) @ 6600 rpm	251 lb⋅ft (340 N⋅m) @ 3200 rpm
2008	Buick Enclave	275 hp (205 kW; 279 PS) @ 6600 rpm	251 lb⋅ft (340 N⋅m) @ 3200 rpm
2007–2013	Chevrolet Caprice	240 hp (179 kW; 243 PS) @ 6500 rpm	243 lb⋅ft (329 N⋅m) @ 2600 rpm
2007–2009	Suzuki XL-7	252 hp (188 kW; 255 PS) @ 6500 rpm	243 lb⋅ft (329 N⋅m) @ 2300 rpm
2008–2009	Chevrolet Equinox Sport	264 hp (197 kW; 268 PS) @ 6500 rpm	250 lb⋅ft (339 N⋅m) @ 2300 rpm
2008–2009	Pontiac Torrent GXP	264 hp (197 kW; 268 PS) @ 6500 rpm	250 lb⋅ft (339 N⋅m) @ 2300 rpm
2008–2009	Pontiac G8	256 hp (191 kW; 260 PS) @ 6300 rpm	248 lb⋅ft (336 N⋅m) @ 2100 rpm
2008–2009	Saturn Vue XR / Red Line	257 hp (192 kW; 261 PS) @ 6500 rpm	248 lb⋅ft (336 N⋅m) @ 2100 rpm

=== LLT ===
The 3.6 L (3,564 cc) LLT is a direct injected version based on the earlier LY7 engine. It was first unveiled in May 2006, and the DI version was claimed to have 15% greater power, 8% greater torque, and 3% better fuel economy than its port-injected counterpart. The LLT engine has a compression ratio of 11.3:1, and has been certified by the SAE to produce 302 hp (225 kW; 306 PS) at 6300 rpm and 272 lb⋅ft (369 N⋅m) of torque at 5200 rpm on regular unleaded (87 octane) gasoline. This engine debuted on the 2008 Cadillac STS and CTS. GM used an LLT in all 2009–2017 Lambda-derived crossover SUVs to allow class-leading fuel economy in light of the new Corporate Average Fuel Economy (CAFE) standards. In these crossovers, the LLT engine produced up to 288 hp (215 kW; 292 PS) and 270 lb⋅ft (366 N⋅m) of torque.

Applications:

Year(s)	Model	Power	Torque
2008–2011	Cadillac CTS	304 hp (227 kW; 308 PS) @ 6400 rpm	273 lb⋅ft (370 N⋅m) @ 5200 rpm
2008–2011	Cadillac STS	302 hp (225 kW; 306 PS) @ 6300 rpm	272 lb⋅ft (369 N⋅m) @ 5200 rpm
2009–2017	Chevrolet Traverse single exhaust	281 hp (210 kW; 285 PS) @ 6300 rpm	266 lb⋅ft (361 N⋅m) @ 3400 rpm
2009	Saturn Outlook single exhaust	281 hp (210 kW; 285 PS) @ 6300 rpm	266 lb⋅ft (361 N⋅m) @ 3400 rpm
2009–2017	Chevrolet Traverse dual exhaust	288 hp (215 kW; 292 PS) @ 6300 rpm	270 lb⋅ft (366 N⋅m) @ 3400 rpm
2009	Saturn Outlook dual exhaust	288 hp (215 kW; 292 PS) @ 6300 rpm	270 lb⋅ft (366 N⋅m) @ 3400 rpm
2009–2017	Buick Enclave	288 hp (215 kW; 292 PS) @ 6300 rpm	270 lb⋅ft (366 N⋅m) @ 3400 rpm
2009–2016	GMC Acadia	288 hp (215 kW; 292 PS) @ 6300 rpm	270 lb⋅ft (366 N⋅m) @ 3400 rpm
2009–2011	Daewoo Veritas	248 hp (185 kW; 251 PS) @ 6600 rpm	246 lb⋅ft (334 N⋅m) @ 2800 rpm
2009–2011	Holden VE Commodore SV6	281 hp (210 kW; 285 PS) @ 6400 rpm	258 lb⋅ft (350 N⋅m) @ 2900 rpm
2009–2011	Holden WM Statesman/Caprice	281 hp (210 kW; 285 PS) @ 6400 rpm	258 lb⋅ft (350 N⋅m) @ 2900 rpm
2010–2011	Buick LaCrosse CXS	280 hp (209 kW; 284 PS) @ 6400 rpm	259 lb⋅ft (351 N⋅m) @ 5200 rpm
2010–2011	Chevrolet Camaro	312 hp (233 kW; 316 PS) @ 6400 rpm	278 lb⋅ft (377 N⋅m) @ 5200 rpm
2010–2011	Cadillac SLS (China)	307 hp (229 kW; 311 PS) @ 6400 rpm	276 lb⋅ft (374 N⋅m) @ 5200 rpm

=== LFX ===
The LFX is an enhanced version of the LLT engine developed jointly by Holden and Cadillac. Introduced in the 2012 Holden VE Commodore SV6 and the 2012 Chevrolet Camaro LS/LT, it is 20.5 pounds (9.3 kg) lighter than the LLT, thanks to a redesigned cylinder head, integrated exhaust manifold, and composite intake manifold. Other components like the timing chains, fuel injectors, intake valves, and fuel pump have also been updated. They also updated the cam phasing and variable valve timing system compared to the LLT. Power and torque are up slightly from the LLT. The compression ratio is 11.5:1. The LFX also features E85 flex-fuel capability.

Applications:

Year(s)	Model	Power	Torque	Dyno chart
2011–2015	Holden WM II/WN Caprice	281 hp (210 kW; 285 PS) @ 6700 rpm	258 lb⋅ft (350 N⋅m) @ 2800 rpm	
2011–2013	Holden VE II Commodore (MY 2012)	281 hp (210 kW; 285 PS) @ 6700 rpm	258 lb⋅ft (350 N⋅m) @ 2800 rpm	
2013–2017	Holden VF Commodore	281 hp (210 kW; 285 PS) @ 6700 rpm	258 lb⋅ft (350 N⋅m) @ 2800 rpm	
2012–2016	Buick LaCrosse	303 hp (226 kW; 307 PS) @ 6800 rpm	264 lb⋅ft (358 N⋅m) @ 5300 rpm	link
2012–2014	Cadillac CTS (2014 Wagon & Coupe only)	318 hp (237 kW; 322 PS) @ 6800 rpm	275 lb⋅ft (373 N⋅m) @ 4900 rpm	link
2012–2015	Cadillac CTS (2012 - 2013 Sedan Performance Trim only)	321 hp (239 kW; 325 PS) @ 6800 rpm	275 lb⋅ft (373 N⋅m) @ 4900 rpm	link
2013–2015	Cadillac ATS	321 hp (239 kW; 325 PS) @ 6800 rpm	274 lb⋅ft (371 N⋅m) @ 4800 rpm	link
2012–2016	Cadillac SRX	308 hp (230 kW; 312 PS) @ 6800 rpm	265 lb⋅ft (359 N⋅m) @ 2400 rpm	link
2012–2015	Chevrolet Camaro	323 hp (241 kW; 327 PS) @ 6800 rpm	278 lb⋅ft (377 N⋅m) @ 4800 rpm	link
2012–2017	Chevrolet Caprice PPV	301 hp (224 kW; 305 PS) @ 6700 rpm	265 lb⋅ft (359 N⋅m) @ 4800 rpm	link
2012–2016	Chevrolet Impala/Impala Limited	302 hp (225 kW; 306 PS) @ 6500 rpm	262 lb⋅ft (355 N⋅m) @ 5300 rpm	
2013–2019	Cadillac XTS	304 hp (227 kW; 308 PS) @ 6800 rpm	264 lb⋅ft (358 N⋅m) @ 5200 rpm	link
2013–2017	Chevrolet Equinox	301 hp (224 kW; 305 PS) @ 6500 rpm	272 lb⋅ft (369 N⋅m) @ 4800 rpm	link
2013–2017	GMC Terrain	301 hp (224 kW; 305 PS) @ 6500 rpm	272 lb⋅ft (369 N⋅m) @ 4800 rpm	link
2014–2020	Chevrolet Impala	305 hp (227 kW; 309 PS) @ 6500 rpm	262 lb⋅ft (355 N⋅m) @ 5300 rpm	link
2015–2016	Chevrolet Colorado	305 hp (227 kW; 309 PS) @ 6800 rpm	269 lb⋅ft (365 N⋅m) @ 4000 rpm	link
2015–2016	GMC Canyon	305 hp (227 kW; 309 PS) @ 6800 rpm	269 lb⋅ft (365 N⋅m) @ 4000 rpm	link

=== LWR ===
The LWR is dedicated LPG 3.6-liter engine. Introduced in the MY 2012 Holden VE Commodore, Based on the 3.6-litre LY7 engine, the LWR had a vapour injection system. The vapour injection system injected gas directly into the air intake runner, thereby preventing excess gas from circulating through the air intake system. Although liquid LPG injection generally produces more power, Holden justified vapour injection on the grounds of lower fuel consumption, lower CO_{2} emissions, reduced pumping and parasitic losses, and start-up reliability in hot weather.

The dedicated LPG LWR engine produced peak power and torque of 180 kW (245 PS; 241 hp) at 6000 rpm and 320 N⋅m (236 lb⋅ft) at 2000 rpm. The LWR engine was mated to GM's six-speed 6L45 automatic transmission and, over the combined ADR 81/02 test cycle, the Commodore Omega achieved fuel consumption of 11.8 L/100 km (24 mpg_{‑imp}; 19.9 mpg_{‑US}) – an improvement of 1.6 L/100 km compared to its dual-fuel LW2 predecessor. Furthermore, the LWR engine exceeded Euro 6 emissions standards.

- Specially hardened valves and valve seats.
- A redesigned cylinder head and manifold for improved air flow.
- Variable exhaust valve timing (the LW2 engine only had variable intake valve timing)
- Specially-developed fuel injectors.
- New pistons with pentroof-style centre-domes and valve eyelets for a higher compression ratio of 12.2:1 (compared to 10.2:1 for the dual fuel engine).
- A new fuel rail and a new LPG fuel filter.

Applications:

Year(s)	Model	Power	Torque
2012–2013	Holden VE II Commodore (MY 2012)	241 hp (180 kW; 244 PS) @ 6000 rpm	236 lb⋅ft (320 N⋅m) @ 2000 rpm
2013–2015	Holden VF Commodore	241 hp (180 kW; 244 PS) @ 6000 rpm	236 lb⋅ft (320 N⋅m) @ 2000 rpm
2012–2015	Holden WM II/WN Caprice	241 hp (180 kW; 244 PS) @ 6000 rpm	236 lb⋅ft (320 N⋅m) @ 2000 rpm

=== LCS ===
The 3.6 L (3,564 cc) LCS was derived from the direct-injected LLT for use in hybrids, using the two-mode system. Differences from the LLT included a slightly lower compression ratio, 11.3:1, and lower power and torque peaks. It was to debut in the 2009 Saturn Vue Hybrid, where it would have made 262 hp (195 kW; 266 PS) at 6100 rpm and 250 lb⋅ft (339 N⋅m) of torque at 4800 rpm. Fuel economy ratings would have been 6–8 km/L (17–23 mpg_{‑imp}; 14–19 mpg_{‑US}) in city, and 9–11 km/L (25–31 mpg_{‑imp}; 21–26 mpg_{‑US}) on highway. However, GM cancelled its plans for the Saturn Vue Hybrid.

=== LF3 ===
The 3.6 L twin-turbocharged version for the 2014 Cadillac CTS and XTS was announced at the 2013 NYAS.

The engine is rated at 420 hp (313 kW; 426 PS) of power at 5750 rpm and 430 lb⋅ft (583 N⋅m) of torque at 3500–4500 rpm (with 90% of torque being available at 2500–5500 rpm) and helps the CTS achieve 0–60 mph (0–97 km/h) time of 4.6 seconds with an 8-speed automatic transmission.

In essence, the twin-turbo 3.6 L V6 is the forced-induction variant of the popular LFX V6 found in the Cadillac ATS, XTS, and SRX, among many other GM models, with several important upgrades, including:

- All-new cylinder block casting
- All-new cylinder head castings
- Strengthened connecting rods
- Forged steel crankshaft
- Continuously variable valve timing
- Large 38.3 mm (1.51 in) intake valves and 30.6 mm (1.20 in) sodium-filled exhaust valves
- Machined, domed aluminum pistons with top steel ring carrier for greater strength
- 10.2:1 compression ratio
- Patented, integrated charge air cooler system with low-volume air ducts
- Twin turbochargers produce more than 12 psi (83 kPa)
- Vacuum-actuated wastegates with electronic control valves
- All-new direct injection fuel system
- Tuned air inlet and outlet resonators, aluminum cam covers, and other features that contribute to exceptional quietness and smoothness

Applications:

Year(s)	Model	Power	Torque	Dyno chart
2014–2019	Cadillac XTS	404 hp (301 kW; 410 PS) @ 6000 rpm	369 lb⋅ft (500 N⋅m) @ 1900–5600 rpm	link
2014–2019	Cadillac CTS	420 hp (313 kW; 426 PS) @ 5750 rpm	430 lb⋅ft (583 N⋅m) @ 3500–4500 rpm	link

=== LF4 ===
The LF4 is a higher-performance variant of the LF3 for use in the Cadillac ATS-V and Cadillac CT4-V Blackwing. Changes to the LF3 include:

- Turbochargers with low-inertia titanium-aluminide turbines and vacuum-actuated wastegates for more responsive torque production
- Compressors matched for peak efficiency at peak power levels, for optimal track performance
- Patent-pending low-volume charge-cooling system that optimizes packaging efficiency and maximizes boost pressure
- To complement the quick spooling turbochargers, lightweight titanium connecting rods that reduce inertia of the rotating assembly were used on all ATS-V models, while only manual transmission CT4-V Blackwing models featured titanium connecting rods. 10-speed automatic CT4-V Blackwing models featured steel connecting rods.
- Peak boost increased to 18 psi (1.2 bar), from 12 psi (0.83 bar)
- Higher-flow fuel injectors
- Oil pan baffling for better oil flow at high cornering speeds

Applications:

Year(s)	Model	Power	Torque	Dyno chart
2016–2019	Cadillac ATS-V, Cadillac ATS-V Coupe	464 hp (346 kW; 470 PS) @ 5850 RPM	445 lb⋅ft (603 N⋅m) @ 3500 RPM	2016 link
2022–2026	Cadillac CT4-V Blackwing	472 hp (352 kW; 479 PS) @ 5750 RPM	445 lb⋅ft (603 N⋅m) @ 3500 RPM	

=== LFR ===
The LFR is a bi-fuel variant of the LFX, although multi-point fuel injection is used for both the gasoline and CNG instead of direct-injection.

Applications:

Year(s)	Model	Power	Torque	Dyno chart
2015–2017	Chevrolet Impala Bi-Fuel	CNG 232 hp (173 kW; 235 PS) @ 6000 RPM	CNG 218 lb⋅ft (296 N⋅m) @ 5200 RPM	2016 CNG link
2015–2017	Chevrolet Impala Bi-Fuel	Gasoline 258 hp (192 kW; 262 PS) @ 5900 RPM	Gasoline 244 lb⋅ft (331 N⋅m) @ 4800 RPM	2016 Gas link

=== LFY ===
The LFY is similar to the LFX, but adds stop-start technology and has improved airflow.

Applications:

Year(s)	Model	Power	Torque
2018–2024	Buick Enclave	310 hp (231 kW; 314 PS) @ 6800 rpm	266 lb⋅ft (361 N⋅m) @ 2800 rpm
2018–2023	Chevrolet Traverse	310 hp (231 kW; 314 PS) @ 6800 rpm	266 lb⋅ft (361 N⋅m) @ 2800 rpm

== Fourth generation ==
Starting with the 2016 Cadillac models, a new generation of High Feature V6s were developed. These new engines have redesigned block architectures with bore centers increased from 103 mm (4.055 in) on prior HFV6 engines to 106 mm (4.173 in) and a redesigned cooling system to target the hottest areas while also facilitating faster warm-up. They also incorporate engine start-stop technology, cylinder-deactivation, 2-stage oil pumps, and updated variable valve timing featuring intermediate park technology for late-intake valve closure. Both engines debuted in the 2016 Cadillac CT6.

=== 3.0 L ===
==== LGW ====
Bore and stroke of 86 mm × 85.8 mm (3.39 in × 3.38 in) are used, along with a 9.8:1 compression ratio and twin turbos with titanium-aluminide turbine wheels. Maximum engine speed is 6500 RPM. Premium unleaded fuel is required.

Applications:

Year(s)	Model	Power	Torque	Dyno chart
2016–2019	Cadillac CT6	404 hp (301 kW; 410 PS) @ 5700 RPM	400 lb⋅ft (542 N⋅m) @ 2500-5100 RPM	dyno chart

==== LGY ====
Bore and stroke of 86 mm × 85.8 mm (3.39 in × 3.38 in) are used, along with a 9.8:1 compression ratio and twin turbos with titanium-aluminide turbine wheels. Maximum engine speed is 6500 RPM. Premium unleaded fuel is required.

Applications:

Year(s)	Model	Power	Torque	Dyno chart
2020–present	Cadillac CT5	335 hp (250 kW; 340 PS) @ 5600 RPM	405 lb⋅ft (549 N⋅m) @ 2400-4400 RPM	
2020–present	Cadillac CT5	V: 360 hp (268 kW; 365 PS) @ 5600 RPM	V: 405 lb⋅ft (549 N⋅m) @ 2400-4400 RPM	

=== 3.6 L ===
==== LGX ====
Along with the increased bore spacing, the new 3.6 L DI V6 has larger bores than before, growing from 94 mm (3.701 in) to 95 mm (3.740 in) with the same 85.8 mm (3.378 in) stroke as the 3.0 L LGW, for a displacement of 3.6 L (3,649 cc). Intake and exhaust valves are also increased in size along with other changes to the cylinder head. The only part shared with the prior generation is the hydraulic lash adjusters in the valvetrain. The LGX was benchmarked against the 3.7 L VQ37VHR of the 2015 Infiniti Q40. Compression ratio is 11.5:1 and maximum engine speed is 7200 RPM.

Compared to GM's LFX/LFY 3.6 L engine, the LGX features active fuel management, NVH enhancements and slightly more torque.

The LGX was on Ward's 10 Best Engines for 2016.

Applications:

Year(s)	Model	Power	Torque	Dyno chart
2016–2019	Cadillac CT6	335 hp (250 kW; 340 PS) @ 6800 RPM	284 lb⋅ft (385 N⋅m) @ 5300 RPM	2016 link
2016–2024	Chevrolet Camaro	335 hp (250 kW; 340 PS) @ 6800 RPM	284 lb⋅ft (385 N⋅m) @ 5300 RPM	2016 link
2016–2019	Cadillac ATS	335 hp (250 kW; 340 PS) @ 6800 RPM	285 lb⋅ft (386 N⋅m) @ 5300 RPM	2016 link
2016–2019	Cadillac CTS	335 hp (250 kW; 340 PS) @ 6800 RPM	285 lb⋅ft (386 N⋅m) @ 5300 RPM	2016 link
2017–2019	Buick LaCrosse	310 hp (231 kW; 314 PS) @ 6800 RPM	282 lb⋅ft (382 N⋅m) @ 5200 RPM	
2018–2020	Buick Regal GS	310 hp (231 kW; 314 PS) @ 6800 RPM	282 lb⋅ft (382 N⋅m) @ 5200 RPM	
2017–present	Cadillac XT5	310 hp (231 kW; 314 PS) @ 6600 RPM	271 lb⋅ft (367 N⋅m) @ 5000 RPM	
2017–2023	GMC Acadia	310 hp (231 kW; 314 PS) @ 6600 RPM	271 lb⋅ft (367 N⋅m) @ 5000 RPM	
2020–2025	Cadillac XT6	310 hp (231 kW; 314 PS) @ 6600 RPM	271 lb⋅ft (367 N⋅m) @ 5000 RPM	
2018–2020	Holden ZB Commodore	315 hp (235 kW; 319 PS) @ 6800 RPM	281 lb⋅ft (381 N⋅m) @ 5200 RPM	
2019–2026	Chevrolet Blazer	308 hp (230 kW; 312 PS) @ 6600 RPM	269 lb⋅ft (365 N⋅m) @ 5000 RPM	

==== LGZ ====
The LGZ is a variant of the LGX designed for use in the Chevrolet Colorado and GMC Canyon.

Applications:

Year(s)	Model	Power	Torque
2017–2022	GMC Canyon	308 hp (230 kW; 312 PS) @ 6800 RPM	275 lb⋅ft (373 N⋅m) @ 4000 RPM
2017–2022	Chevrolet Colorado	308 hp (230 kW; 312 PS) @ 6800 RPM	275 lb⋅ft (373 N⋅m) @ 4000 RPM

== 7.2L V12 ==
On March 21, 2007, AutoWeek reported that GM was planning to develop a 60-degree V12 based on this engine family to power the top version of Cadillac's upcoming flagship sedan. This Cadillac would essentially have had two 3.6 L High Feature V6s attached crankshaft-to-crankshaft and would have featured high-end technologies including direct injection and cylinder deactivation. If this engine were developed, it would have displaced 7.2 liters, and produced approximately 600 hp (447 kW; 608 PS) and 540 lb⋅ft (732 N⋅m) of torque. Development of the engine was reportedly being conducted in Australia by Holden, with a potential HSV or Statesman application.

In August 2008, GM announced that development of the V12 had been cancelled.

== Timing chain issues ==
Earlier production 2.8 L, 3.0 L, 3.2 L, and 3.6 L engines with the three chain design suffered from premature timing chain failures because of a faulty PCV system and extended oil change intervals. Most of the problems occurred on pre-LFX engines.

== Holden High Feature engine ==
Holden sold a HFV6 engine under the name Alloytec. The High Feature moniker on the Holden produced engine is reserved for the twin cam phasing high output version. The block was designed to be expandable from 2.8 L to 4.0 L. High Feature V6 engines were previously produced in Fishermans Bend, Port Melbourne, Australia, and remain in production at the following four manufacturing locations: St. Catharines Engine Plant, St. Catharines, Canada; Flint Engine South in Flint, Michigan, United States; Romulus Engine Plant in Romulus, Michigan; and Ramos Arizpe, Coahuila, Mexico. The assembly lines for the St. Catharines and Flint facilities were manufactured by Hirata Corporation at its powertrain facility in Kumamoto, Japan. Most of the designs of this motor happened in Flint. They were first produced for the Cadillac range. The engine block and cylinder heads are cast at Defiance Foundry in Defiance, Ohio.
