= List of Saturn vehicles =

Former American auto models

This is a list of Saturn vehicles, or vehicles produced by the Saturn Corporation, a former subsidiary of General Motors. The list spans vehicles from 1990 to 2009, with concept vehicles as early as 1984.

== Former production vehicles ==
Image	Model	Timeline		Generations	Size		Chronology		Body Style(s)	Platform	Related
Image	Model	Started	Ended	Generations	US	Euro	Predecessor	Successor	Body Style(s)	Platform	Related
	S-series	1990	2002	3	compact	C		Ion	2-door coupe 3-door coupe 4-door sedan 5-door station wagon	Z	
	L-series	1999	2005	1	midsize	D		Aura	4-door sedan 5-door station wagon	GM2900	Opel Vectra Saab 9-3 Saab 9-5
	Vue	2002	2010	2	compact SUV	J		Chevrolet Captiva Sport	5-door crossover	Theta	Opel Antara Holden Captiva 5
	Ion	2003	2007	1	compact	C	S-series	Astra	4-door coupe 4-door sedan	Delta	Opel/Vauxhall Astra Chevrolet HHR Chevrolet Cobalt Pontiac G5
	Relay	2005	2007	1	fullsize MPV	M	Oldsmobile Silhouette	Outlook	5-door minivan	U	Pontiac Montana Chevrolet Uplander Buick GL8 Buick Terraza
	Sky	2007	2009	1	sports car	S			2-door roadster	Kappa	Pontiac Solstice Opel GT
	Outlook	2007	2010	1	midsize SUV	J	Relay	Chevrolet Traverse	5-door crossover	Lambda	Buick Enclave Chevrolet Traverse GMC Acadia
	Aura	2007	2009	1	midsize	D	L-series		4-door sedan	Epsilon	Fiat Croma Opel/Vauxhall Signum Chevrolet Malibu Saab 9-3 Opel/Vauxhall Vectra Pontiac G6
	Astra	2008	2009	1	compact	C	Ion	Buick Verano	3-door hatchback 5-door hatchback	Delta	Opel/Vauxhall Astra Holden Astra Opel/Vauxhall Zafira

== Concept Models ==
- Saturn Prototype (1984)
- Saturn Prototype (1988)
- Saturn Sport Sedan Concept (1990)
- Saturn SC Performance Edition (1999)
- Saturn CV-1 (2000)
- Saturn SCX (2001)
- Saturn LST (2001)
- Saturn VUE Urban Expression (2001)
- Saturn VUE Outdoor Expression (2001)
- Saturn Sky Concept (2002)
- Saturn ION·EFX (2002)
- Saturn ION QC/T (2003)
- Saturn ION Rally (2003)
- Saturn VUE Red Line Street Play (2004)
- Saturn VUE "Spring Special" (2004)
- Saturn Curve (2004)
- Saturn AURA Concept (2005)
- Saturn PreVue (2006)
- Saturn Astra Tuner (2007)
- Saturn Flextreme (2008)
- Saturn VUE Greenline Hyline (2008)
- Saturn VUE Hybrid 2-Mode (2009)
