= Tauro Sport Auto =

Spanish sportscar brand

Coordinates: 41.607677°N 4.697614°W

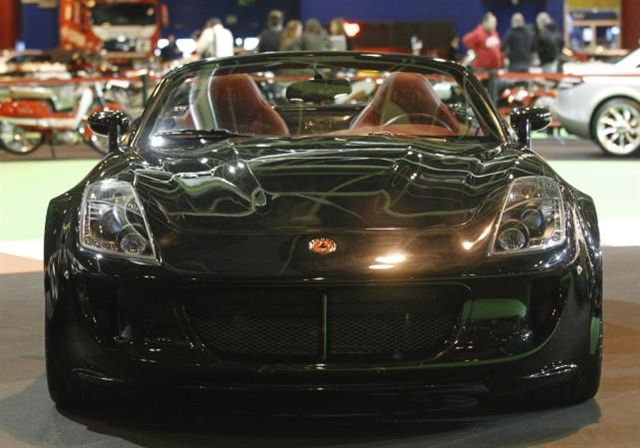
- Company type: Ltd
- Industry: Automotive
- Founded: 2010; 16 years ago
- Founder: Espan Tauro
- Headquarters: Valladolid, Spain
- Area served: Worldwide
- Key people: Pedro J Santos (chair and CEO)
- Products: Sports cars

Tauro Sport Auto was a Spanish manufacturer of luxury sports cars based in Valladolid, founded in 2010, when a group of Spanish businessmen joined with a British manufacturer of racing cars to create the company.

Their most popular model was the Tauro V8. It is based on the mechanical underpinnings i.e. chassis of the Pontiac Solstice and is powered by a Chevrolet-sourced powertrain as its base engine and is offered in four variants: Spider, Coupe, Saeta and Portago. The Spider is based on the Kappa platform, purchased from GM. New body styling and a range of big V-8 has replaced the turbocharged four cylinder, the interior design has now some modifications, upgraded in materials and given a variety of colors. The Tauro's core markets include the European Union, Russia, United Arab Emirates, China, and America.

== History ==
In 2010, several Spanish businessmen, including Pedro J Santos, and a British manufacturer of racing cars joined to create the company based in Valladolid.

They were produced in small series and made to order, with much of the manufacturing process done by hand.

== Models ==
All models are called the Tauro V8. They were all powered by a Chevrolet LS3 engine.

Vehicle name	Duration of production	Number of cylinders	Power (hp)	Displacement cc	Top speed (km/h)	Place of manufacture
V8 Spider	2012–present	8	440/530	6162	295	Spain
V8 Coupé	2013–present	8	440/530	6162	300	Spain
V8 Saeta	2014–present	8	440/530	6162	~	Spain
V8 Portago	2014–present	8	440/530	6162	~	Spain

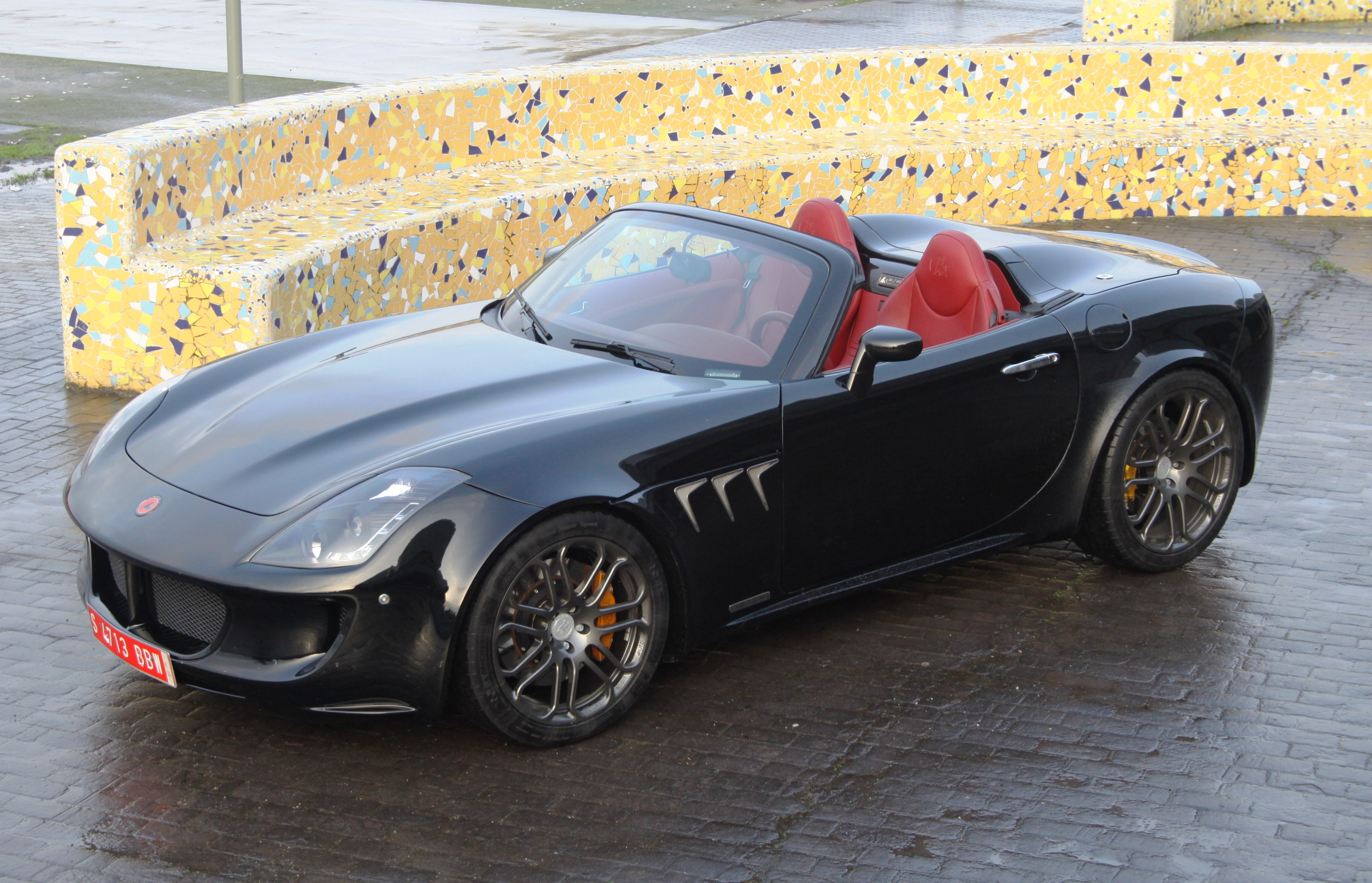
Tauro Sport Auto V8 Spider in Miami Beach

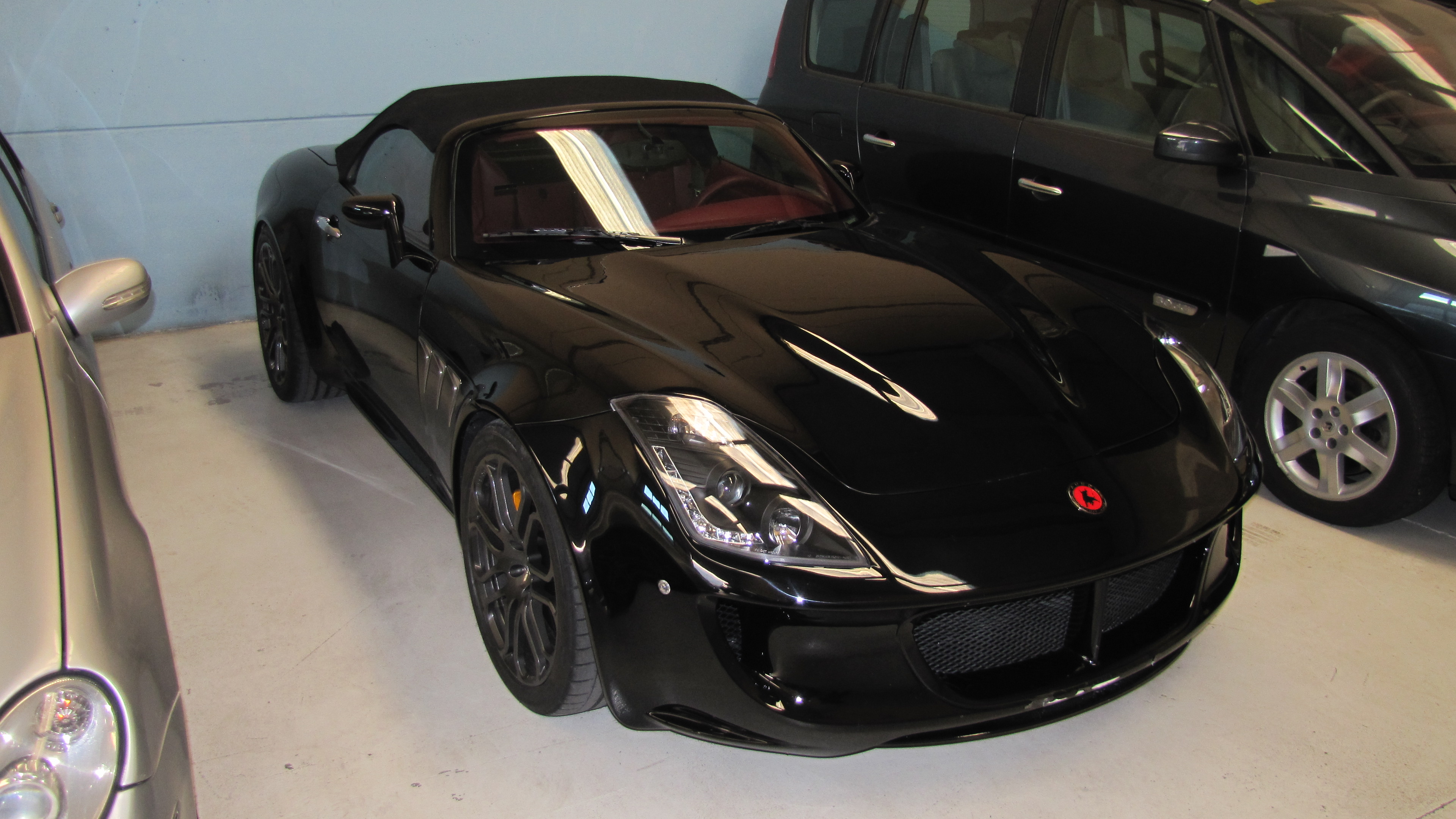
Tauro Sport Auto V8 Spider

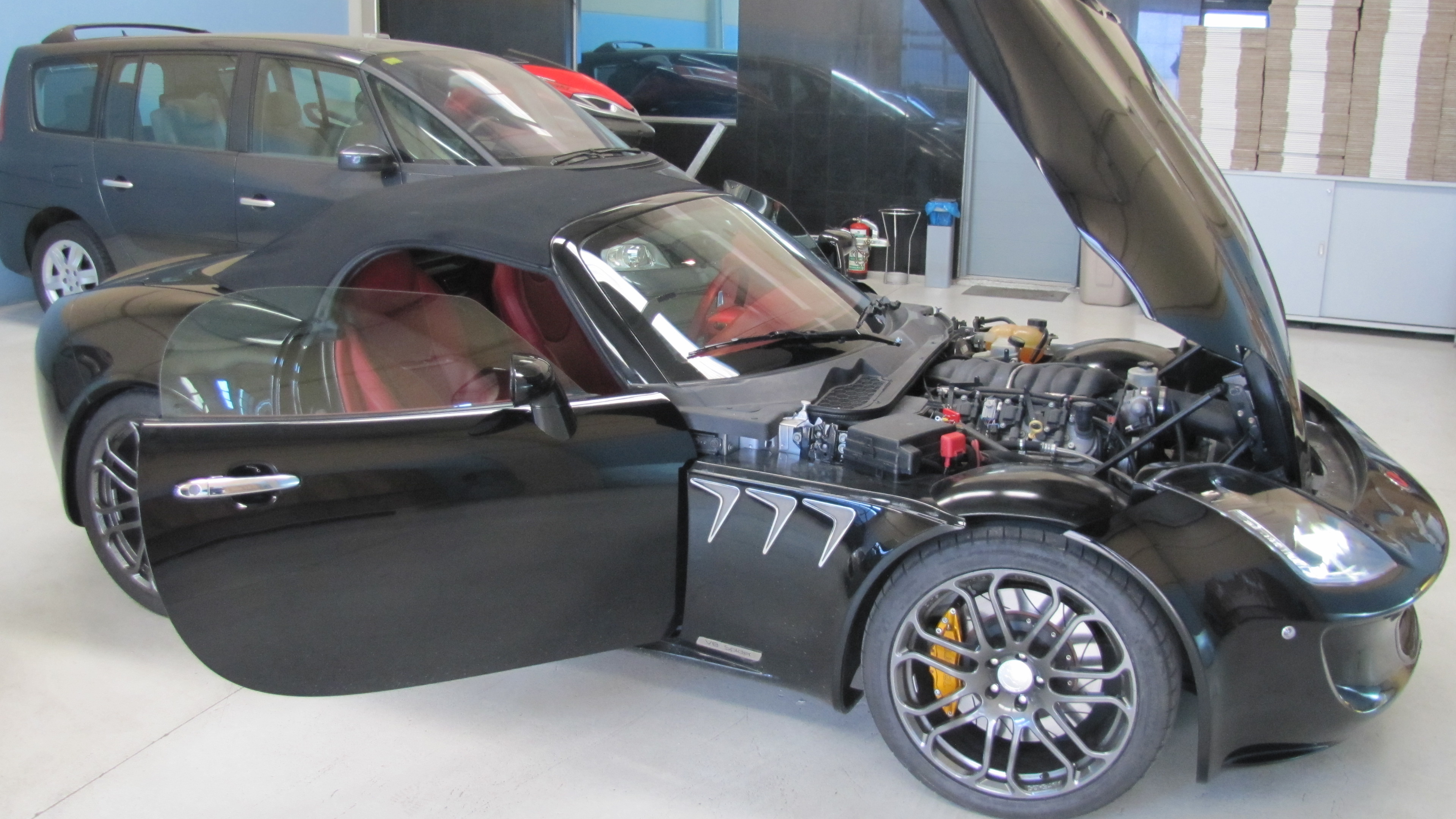
Chevrolet V8 engine in a Tauro Sport Auto V8 Spider
- The Tauro V8 Spider is a traditional front engine, rear wheel drive roadster.
- The Tauro V8 Coupé is the hardtop version.
- The Tauro V8 Saeta takes its name from the first jet plane made in Spain in the mid-twentieth century, the Hispano Aviación HA-200 Saeta and incorporates some of its design elements.
- Tauro V8 Spider – Coupé – Saeta and Super Saeta were designed by Christopher Reitz, Ferdinand Porsche's great grandson.
- The Tauro V8 Portago is a Barchetta named after the Marquis, Portago, Spanish F1 gentleman driver who died in the 1957 Mille Miglia while driving for Ferrari.

== See also ==
- Sports car
- Supercar
- Hispano-Suiza
- Pegaso
