= General Motors Y platform =

Car designation

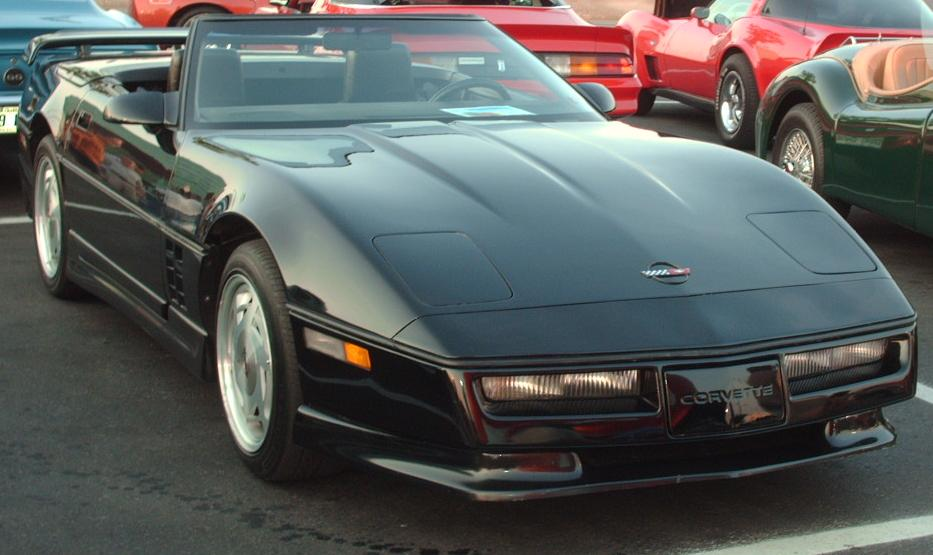
Chevrolet Corvette C4 Convertible

The Y platform, or Y body, designation has been used twice by the General Motors Corporation to describe a series of vehicles all built on the same basic body and sharing many parts and characteristics. The first was for a group of entry-level compacts including the conventional front-engine compacts built by GM divisions Buick, Oldsmobile and Pontiac from 1961 to 1963. The second, and current, incarnation is used for a high-end rear-wheel drive sports-car platform (chiefly that of the Chevrolet Corvette) from the 1970s through the 2000s.

== First Y platform (1960–1963) ==
The original Y bodies were:

- Buick Special (1961–1963)
- Buick Skylark (1962–1963)
- Oldsmobile F-85 (1961–1963)
- Oldsmobile Cutlass (1961–1963)
- Oldsmobile Jetfire (1962–1963)
- Pontiac Tempest (1961–1963)
- Pontiac Tempest LeMans (1961–1962)
- Pontiac LeMans (1963)

Initially, each of the Y-body compacts from Buick, Olds and Pontiac were only offered as four-door sedans and station wagons when introduced in the fall of 1960 as 1961 models. In mid-1961, each of three divisions introduced pillared two-door models to the line with sportier versions of the Buick and Olds models added including the Special Skylark and F-85 Cutlass, both of which featured bucket seats, custom interior and exterior trim, and more powerful engines. For 1962, convertibles were added to the lineup by each of the divisions, with Pontiac also adding the sportier Tempest LeMans coupe and convertible to its compact lineup.

This all-new platform replaced vehicles GM was importing from Europe, selling the Vauxhall Victor that was made in England.

The rear-engined 1960-69 Chevrolet Corvair Z-body up to 1964 used a variation of the rear swing-axle suspension and a transaxle similar to that found on the 1961-63 Pontiac Tempest. The 1961-62 Corvair station wagons even utilized a roofline similar to that on the 1961-63 Y-body wagons. Chevrolet's front-engine compact, introduced as the Chevy II for 1962 had some dimensions similar to the Y-body cars, but had a two-inch shorter wheelbase, was smaller in length and width and utilized a distinct X-body platform which featured semi-unibody construction, single-leaf spring rear suspension and conventional in-line four-, six-cylinder and later small-block V-8 engines.

=== First Y platform innovations ===
The Y-body family of cars contained more innovative features than all other American products of that decade. Each model contained at least one notable advance:

- Buick Special and Oldsmobile F-85 for all three years shared an aluminum-block 215-cubic-inch V8 engine featuring cast-iron liners to prevent overheating and block warpage problems common with aluminum-block engines. Although Buick and Olds shared the same basic engine design, both divisions used different cylinder heads, camshafts, carburetors and compression ratios. The 215 V8 was also available on the Pontiac Tempest for 1961 and 1962 and used the Buick version, but very few Tempests were so equipped.
- For 1962, Buick introduced a new 198-cubic-inch V6 engine for the lower-line Special models in order to allow for a lower base price. That V6 shared many parts and dimensions with the aluminum V8 engine but featured a cast iron block.
- Oldsmobile introduced a turbocharged version of the 215 V8 in mid-1962 for a special performance version of the F-85/Cutlass called the Jetfire. This engine was among the first production turbocharged engines ever offered in a passenger car, the other being the Chevrolet Corvair's turbocharged flat-six engine introduced simultaneously for the Monza Spyder. The Olds Jetfire turbocharged V8 featured a four-barrel, 10.25:1 compression and was rated at 215 horsepower – one horsepower per cubic inch.
- The Pontiac Tempest came standard with a 195-cubic-inch slant four-cylinder engine – then the only U.S.-built passenger car with such an engine. The Tempest four was really created from half a 389-cubic-inch V8 block used in the standard Pontiacs. This engine, available with one- and four-barrel carburetion, offered horsepower ratings ranging from 110 to 166.
- The Tempest also used a rear transmission, or transaxle to permit four-wheel independent suspension, a flat floor, eliminating the driveshaft hump, for improved interior space, while the Buick Special and Olds F-85 used a conventional front engine/front transmission drivetrain, albeit, with a two-piece driveshaft.
- The Tempest also used an independent rear swing-axle suspension similar to the rear-engine Chevy Corvair, while the Buick and Olds compacts featured a conventional rear coil-spring suspension.
- For 1963, Pontiac replaced the Buick-sourced 215 aluminum V8 with a Pontiac-built 336-cubic-inch V8 as the top power option for the Tempest. No one seems to know why the 326 of 1963 was called a 326, because the true displacement was 336. This 326 was based on the big Pontiac's 389 V8 and shared many of the larger engine's dimensions and components with horsepower ratings of 260 and 280. The 1963 326 Tempest/LeMans served as a testbed for the 389-powered 1964 GTO that would be based on a larger and more conventionally engineered Tempest introduced the following year.

Motor Trend magazine named the Corvair as its 1960 Car of the Year, Tempest as 1961's Car of the Year, and the V6 Special received the award in 1962.

=== End of the first Y platform ===
Each of the Buick, Olds and Pontiac Y-body senior compacts were replaced by a larger intermediate-sized platform called the A-Body for the 1964 model year, which was shared with the Chevrolet Chevelle. With the switch from a senior compact to an intermediate-sized platform, most of these "innovative" features were discontinued such as the Tempest's four-cylinder engine and transaxle, the aluminum block V8 (whose tooling was sold to Rover of England who improved the design enjoying considerable success with it as the Rover V8 in models such as the Rover P5B and Range Rover) and the Olds Jetfire's turbocharged version of that V8. Also, the uni-body construction used in the Y-body cars was replaced by conventional body-on-frame construction for the A-body. The Buick V6 was continued and enlarged to 225 cubic inches, with the basic engine remaining in production for many years, with a 3.8-liter or 231-cubic-inch displacement. The aluminum V8 was replaced by conventional cast-iron-block V8s of 300 cubic inches for the Buick Special/Skylark and 330 inches for the Oldsmobile F-85/Cutlass, while Pontiac carried over its 326-cubic-inch V8 to the '64 Tempest/LeMans line while switching the base engine from the four-cylinder to a 215-cubic-inch inline six-cylinder.

== Second Y platform (1976–present) ==
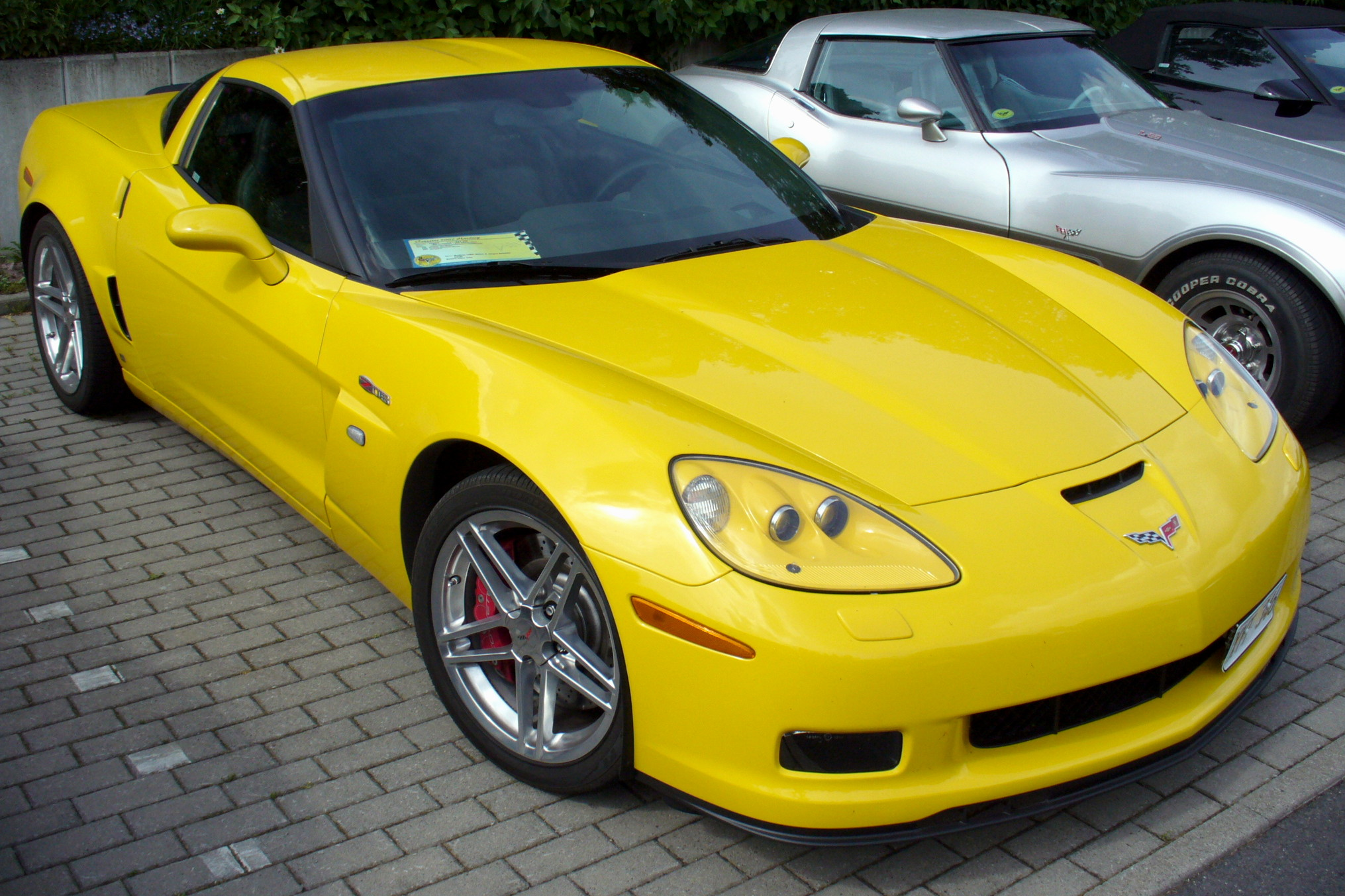
Chevrolet Corvette C6 Z06

Y bodies built for 1976-1980 used a GM-standard 13 character Vehicle Identification Number, or VIN, with the second character denoting the series, followed by the body type, engine code, model year and assembly plant.

Y bodies built for 1981-1984 can be identified by the inclusion of the Y as the fifth character in the 17 character VIN. Y bodies built for 1985 and later can be identified by the inclusion of the Y as the fourth character in the VIN. Only two Y-body cars have been produced in this second group:

- 2004–2009 Cadillac XLR
- 1976–2019 Chevrolet Corvette

The Y-Body has a rear-wheel drive, front-engined (through 2019) V8 layout, accommodating either a small block Chevrolet V8 (such as an LT4 or LS1) in the Corvette, or the 32-valve DOHC Northstar V8 in the XLR. The Y-Body also has 4-wheel independent suspension. Like a standard rear-wheel drive, front-engined chassis, the Y-Body's V8 engine is longitudinally mounted, but unlike many such cars, the Y-Body incorporates a rear-mounted transmission (1997-present) instead of a transmission mounted directly to the engine. Power is transferred to the transmission via a torque tube. The transmission is offered in both 4/5/6/8-speed automatic versions and 6 and 7-speed manual versions. As of 2015 the Y platform is considered as the sole perimeter frame automobile in production (the perimeter frame has an integrated endoskeleton which serves as a safety cage).

The front-engine C7 Corvette (2014-2019) used the Y1XX platform. The mid-engine C8 Corvette (2020-present) uses the Y2XX platform.

GM's Kappa platform was inspired by the Y-body. The distinctive feature of both platforms is the backbone central-tunnel design.

== See also ==
- List of General Motors platforms
