= General Motors Kappa platform =

Automobile platform by General Motors

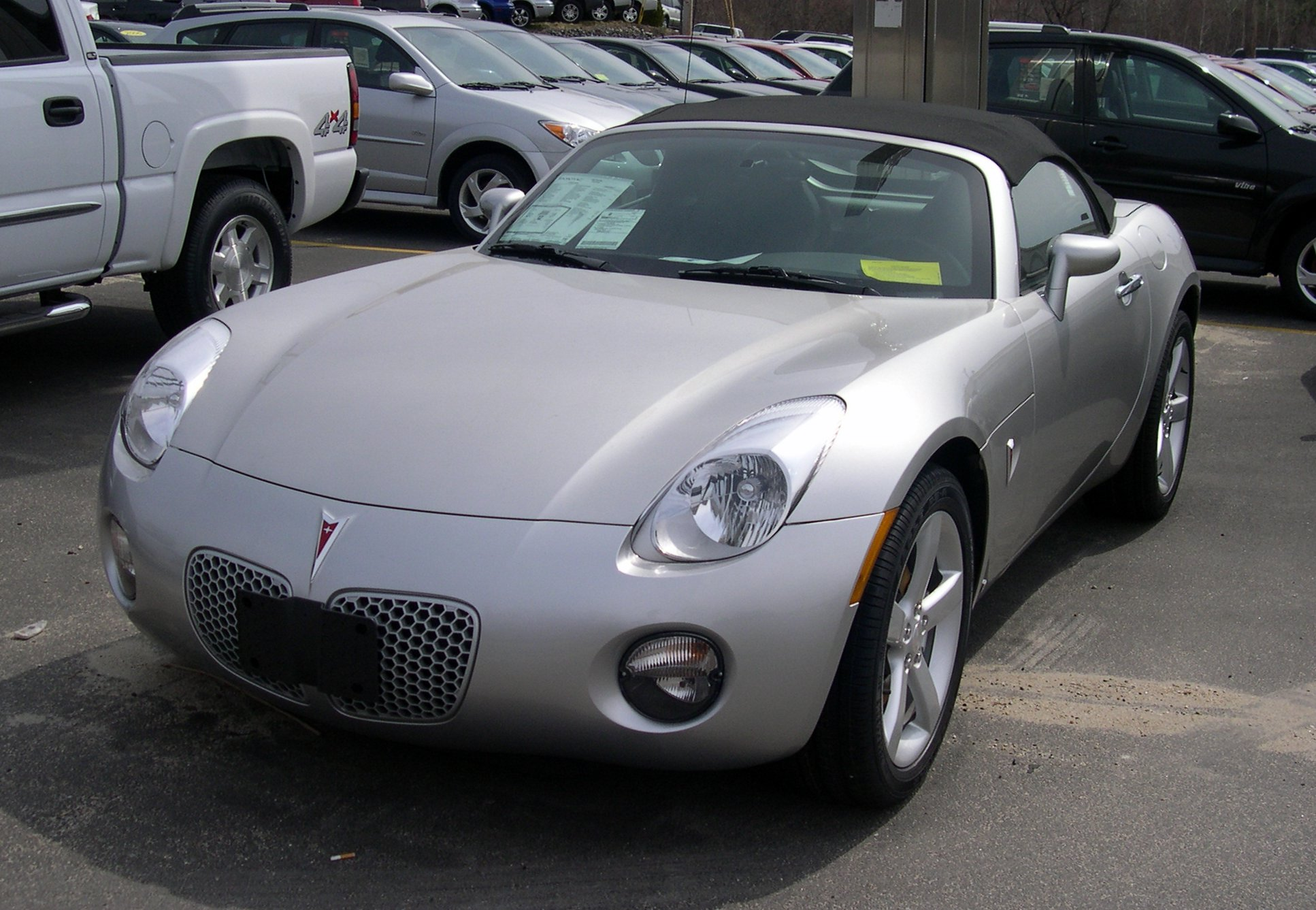
2006 Pontiac Solstice

Kappa was General Motors' subcompact rear-wheel drive automobile platform for roadster applications. The architecture debuted in the 2006 Pontiac Solstice and 2007 Saturn Sky, and ended production in 2009. These vehicles generally have a "M" in the fourth digit of their VIN.

Kappa uses an independent suspension, short-long arm type, in front and rear. The Ecotec engine is widely used, as is a 5-speed manual transmission. A 5-speed automatic was available from January 2006.

In 2002, the Pontiac Solstice Concept was shown in two forms: a drivable roadster convertible, and a design study of a fastback coupe.

The Pontiac Solstice was received positively at the 2002 NAIAS. The drivable roadster concept car shown had been cobbled together from many different components, using a heavily modified portion of the Delta and Epsilon. It was initially to use a 2.2L supercharged variant of the Ecotec engine, producing 240 horsepower (180 kW). The thinking was that this architecture might be heavily modified and used to produce the Solstice in the near future.

It is speculated that when General Motors decided to try to produce the Solstice as a highly styled, low-cost, low-volume niche vehicle for enthusiasts, it became apparent that there were no existing platforms that could be used to achieve the needs of a modern compact rear wheel drive roadster.

Therefore, the Kappa platform was developed to provide the necessary structure for a two-seat, rear-wheel-drive convertible. It features hydro-formed rails and a tunnel structure derived from the Corvette architecture and Sigma, and is designed for a short-long-arm suspension for the front and rear. It features rear wheel drive, longitudinal-mounted transmission and front-mid engine.

It has been stated by GM that the platform has only been designed to accommodate a single engine: the Ecotec. It has also been stated by GM representatives that this platform was only designed to be left-hand drive. However, there are aftermarket tuners that have already accomplished non-trivial engine transplants in Solstices.

Since the Solstice, GM has designed another roadster that looks substantially different, but shares the same underlying Kappa platform: the Saturn Sky. The Saturn Sky was styled after the pattern of the Vauxhall VX Lightning design. There is a European version built on the same platform, essentially a Sky Red Line model with Opel badging, EU spec mirrors and tail lights, and culturally appropriate door implements, reviving the name of Opel GT. A GM Korea version of that variant was also produced under the name Daewoo G2X.

Three other concept vehicles were built on the initial Kappa platform, and shown at the 2004 NAIAS: The Vauxhall VX Lightning, The Saturn Curve and Chevrolet Nomad. All three cars were received reasonably well, but were not nearly as embraced as the original Solstice Concept.

The original 2003 Vauxhall VX Lightning Concept is the same size as the original Solstice Concept, and pieced together in the same manner as the 2002 Solstice Concept, and had been shown in Europe several months earlier, before the Kappa platform had been finalized and named (debuting approximately mid-May 2003, for Vauxhall's centenary celebration). The Vauxhall VX Lightning is the styling pattern after which the appearance of the Saturn Sky is based. When the Vauxhall VX was shown at the 2004 NAIAS, the Lightning part of the name was dropped and the vehicle referred to in the literature at the show as merely the "Vauxhall VX".

The Saturn Curve and the Chevrolet Nomad concept cars were built on "modified" versions of the Kappa platform, and exhibited 12 inches longer wheelbases, and 2+2 seating.

Another concept car, built by Holden and called the Torana TT36, was rumored to have started as a Kappa-based car with a twin-turbocharged V6, but the modifications necessary to accommodate the engine, transmission, and general vehicle size made it necessary to refer to the platform as "based on architecture similar to the Kappa and the Corvette."

A hardtop coupe version of the Pontiac Solstice was produced for the 2009–2010 model years. Kappa production ended with General Motors' bankruptcy in July 2009.

Spanish car maker Tauro used Solstices to market their version called Tauro V8. There is a misconception that people tend to believe that this company purchased the Kappa platform, but in reality they were conversions of existing cars.

== Shared components ==
The Kappa architecture uses major components from nearly every GM division and modern platform:

- The rear axle and differential are from the Sigma-based Cadillac CTS
- The Solstice's interior storage bin is from the Y-body Cadillac XLR
- The passenger-side airbag, steering column, and exterior and interior door handles are from the Delta-based Chevrolet Cobalt, Pontiac G5
- The Solstice's backup lights are from the GMT360 GMC Envoy
- The heating, ventilating, and air conditioning modules are from the Hummer H3
- The Solstice's front fog lamp assembly is from the W-body Pontiac Grand Prix
- The Solstice's steering wheel is from the Delta-based Pontiac G5
- The 2.4 L Ecotec engine is shared with the Delta-based Saturn Ion, Pontiac G6, Chevrolet Cobalt, Pontiac G5, and Chevrolet HHR
- The five-speed manual transmission is from the Hummer H3, GMC Canyon, and Chevrolet Colorado
- The five-speed automatic is from the Cadillac CTS, STS, and SRX
- The Sky's backup light is shared with the first generation Chevrolet Volt

== Vehicles ==
Vehicles based on this platform:

- Pontiac Solstice
- Saturn Sky / Opel GT / Daewoo G2X
- Tauro Sport Auto V8 Spider

Concept vehicles based on this platform:

- Breckland Beira
- Chevrolet Nomad
- Saturn Curve
- Saab Sonnett
- Vauxhall VX Lightning

== See also ==
- List of General Motors platforms
