= Saturn Curve =

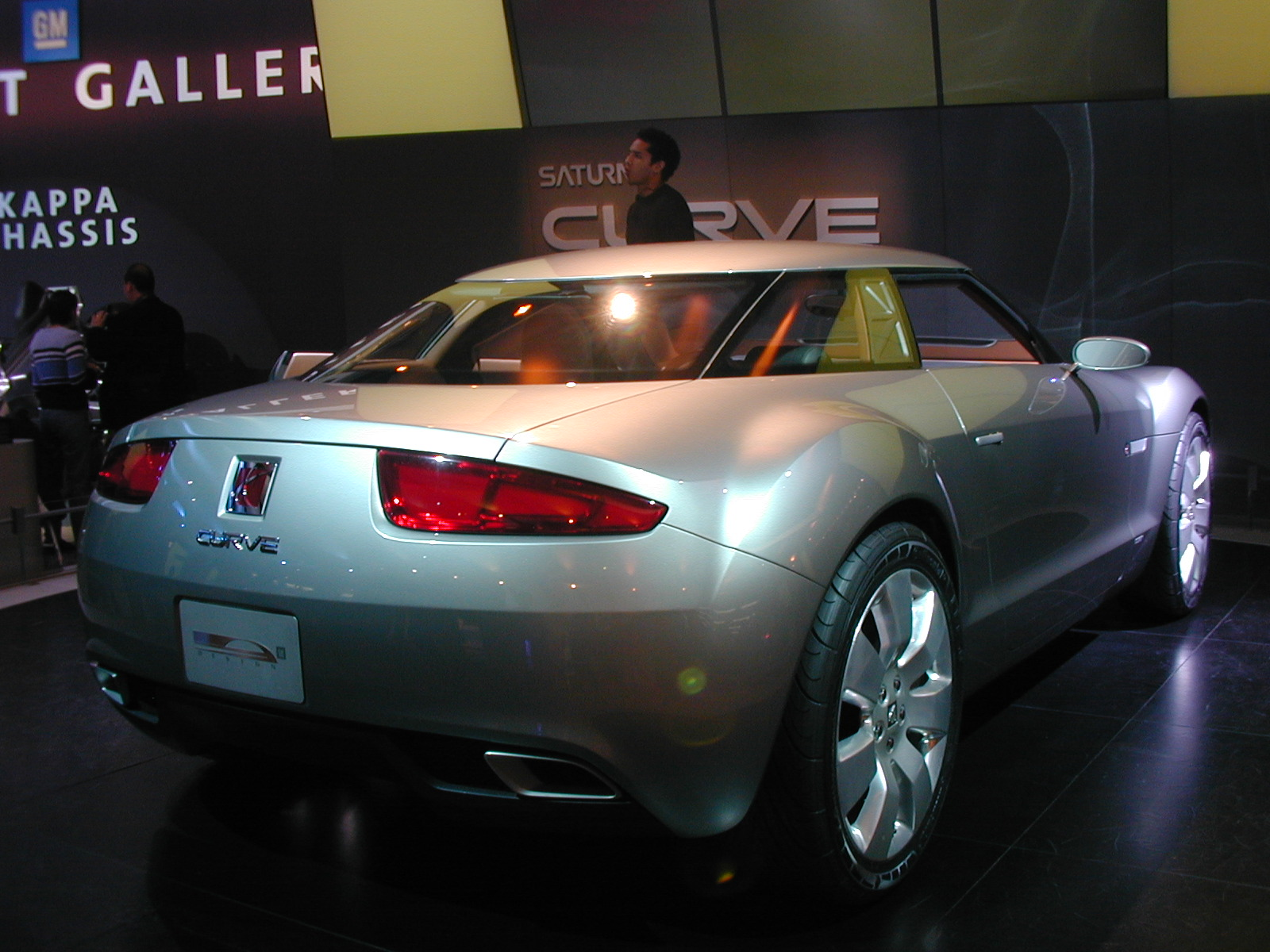

Overview
- Manufacturer: Saturn (General Motors)
- Production: 2004
- Designer: Michael Mauer

Body and chassis
- Class: Concept car
- Body style: 2-door roadster
- Layout: FR layout
- Platform: GM Kappa platform
- Related: Saturn Sky; Pontiac Solstice; Opel GT

Powertrain
- Engine: 2.0L inline-four Ecotec, Supercharged.
- Transmission: Getrag 5-speed manual

Dimensions
- Wheelbase: 2717 mm / 107.0 in
- Length: 3975 mm / 156.5 in
- Width: 1950 mm / 76.8 in
- Height: 1247 mm / 49.1 in

The Saturn Curve is a roadster concept by Saturn designed by Michael Mauer who was the former head of design at Saab Automobile. It was shown at the 2004 North American International Auto Show along with the Saturn Sky concept.

This project would also evolve to a new "Saab Sonett", with a different front styling, but ultimately Saab's intentions to make it an AWD car did not come true, and Saturn opted to go with the Opel project giving birth to the Saturn Sky.
