= Pontiac Solstice =

Two-seat sports car

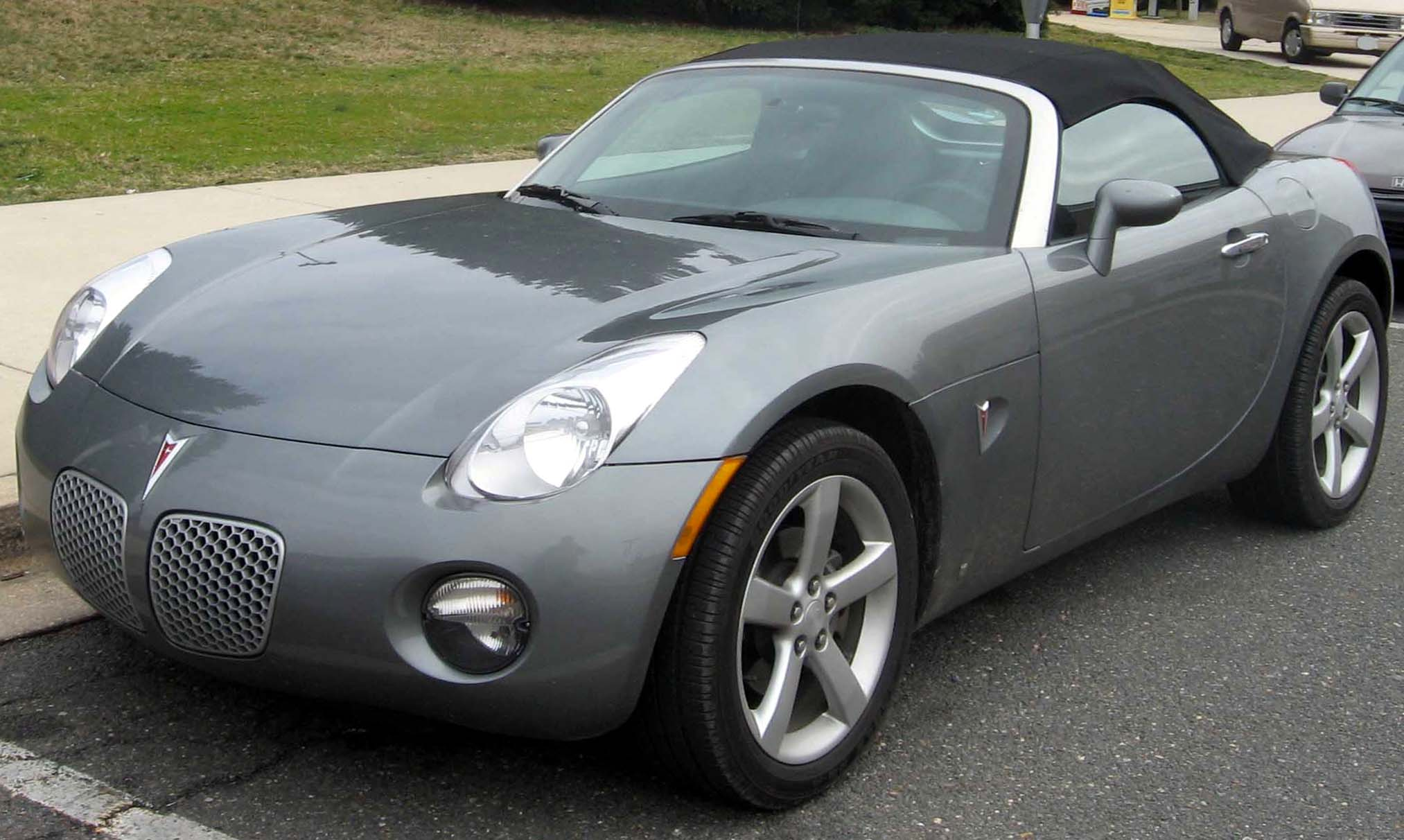

Overview
- Manufacturer: General Motors
- Production: 2005–2009; 65,724 produced
- Model years: 2006–2010
- Assembly: United States: Wilmington, Delaware (Wilmington Assembly)
- Designer: Franz von Holzhausen (2001); Vicki Vlachakis; Wayne Cherry

Body and chassis
- Class: Sports car
- Body style: 2-door roadster; 2-door targa coupe
- Layout: Front mid-engine, rear-wheel-drive
- Platform: GM Kappa platform
- Related: Saturn Sky; Opel GT; Daewoo G2X

Powertrain
- Engine: 2.4 L Ecotec LE5 I4 (gasoline); 2.0 L Ecotec LNF turbo I4 (gasoline)
- Transmission: 5-speed Aisin AR5 manual; 5-speed 5L40-E automatic

Dimensions
- Wheelbase: 95.1 in (2,415.5 mm)
- Length: 157.2 in (3,992.9 mm)
- Width: 71.4 in (1,813.6 mm)
- Height: 50.2 in (1,275.1 mm); 50.9 in (1,292.9 mm) (coupe)
- Curb weight: 2,860 lb (1,297.3 kg) (Base); 2,976 lb (1,349.9 kg) (GXP)

The Pontiac Solstice is a two-passenger, front engine, convertible roadster manufactured and marketed by Pontiac from 2005 to 2010, initially powered by a naturally aspirated 2.4 L I4 engine, producing 177 hp (132 kW) and 166 lb⋅ft (225 N⋅m) of torque..

Introduced at the 2004 North American International Auto Show, production began in Wilmington, Delaware, starting in mid-2005 for the 2006 model year.

The exterior styling of the production Solstice recalls its predecessor, the 2002 Solstice concept. Production was to commence before summer 2005, but delays at the Wilmington plant pushed volume production to the fourth quarter. A hardtop targa top was announced in mid-2008 for model year 2009. The Solstice uses the GM Kappa platform, shared with the Saturn Sky, Opel GT, and Daewoo G2X. It was the brand's first two-seater since the Pontiac Fiero, discontinued in 1988.

== History ==
=== Pontiac Solstice concept ===
The Pontiac Solstice concept car of 2002

Pontiac presented the Solstice in 2002, first as a concept. Initially, it was to be equipped with a 2.2L Ecotec I4 paired with a supercharger for an output of 240 horsepower (180 kW), as well as a Corvette Borg-Warner 6-speed. It was compared to the Dodge Viper and Plymouth Prowler for its retro styling, a choice encouraged by Bob Lutz having "empowered designers to take the lead, prioritizing their vision over that of engineers, analysts, and economists" in regards to the Solstice's styling.

=== Post-concept Solstice ===
GM's Vice Chairman Bob Lutz provided the spark for the Solstice, allocating resources to develop the General Motors Kappa platform in hopes of creating an affordable sports car, with a target price tag of $20,000. In 2005, the Solstice entered production "at a rate of just seven cars per hour in mid-2005" in Wilmington, Delaware's GM production facility despite plans to close the facility the year prior.

On release, the Solstice received more attention than anticipated, leaving GM with 7000 cars projected for production in 2005 and 13,000 orders placed.

The Solstice was a finalist for the North American Car of the Year award in 2006 and had multiple successes in motorsport, especially SCCA.

=== Model Year updates ===
Model year 2006: Debuted with a naturally aspirated 2.4-liter 4-cylinder Ecotec engine making 177 horsepower and 166 lb-ft of torque. Transmissions: Offered with a 5-speed manual or 5-speed automatic. Features: Standard 18-inch wheels; antilock brakes (ABS) and electronic stability control were optional. Club Sport: A rare Z0K Club Sport package was made available for SCCA grassroots racing, adding a stiffer suspension, larger brakes, and a limited-slip differential without extra creature comforts.

Model year 2007: GXP Trim added with a turbocharged 2.0-liter direct-injection 4-cylinder engine producing 260 horsepower and 260 lb-ft of torque; sport-tuned suspension, bigger brakes, StabiliTrak stability control standard, dual exhaust outlets, unique front/rear fascias, shuffling of convenience packages and audio equipment for base models.

Model year 2008: Antilock brakes (ABS) became standard across all models. OnStar safety system became standard equipment, and an upgraded audio system featuring auxiliary inputs and available satellite radio debuted. Introduction of special cosmetic packages including the SCCA T2 Champion Edition (limited to 88 units).

Model year 2009: A targa-style removable hardtop coupe joined the lineup in both base and GXP trims. Standard equipment included traction control, stability control, and a limited-slip rear differential. Due to GM's financial restructuring and the phase-out of the Pontiac brand, 2009 was the final full production year, though assembly ended in mid-2009, resulting in a tiny handful registered as 2010 models.

=== Saturn Sky concept ===
Early in the Saturn brand's history, talk of a convertible 2-door had arisen. As early as 1992, some foundations of ideas had been laid out, but it would not be until 2002 that a genuine convertible concept would be made, at least in any public and official capacity. The actual Sky would draw far more inspiration from the Saturn Curve concept of 2004 and the Pontiac Solstice concept of 2002.

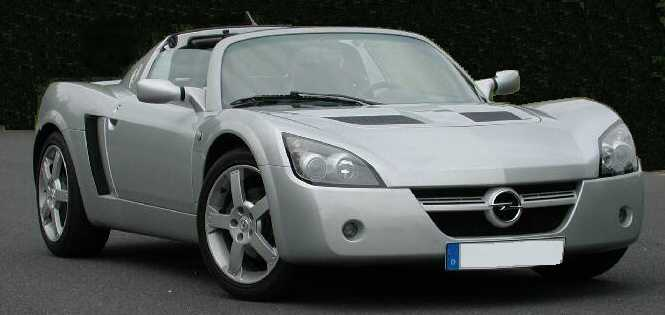
The Opel Speedster was heavily influential on the body styling of the production Sky.

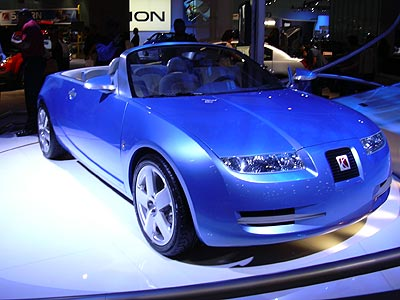
The Sky concept of 2002 was much different from the final product, featuring a 2+2 layout and supercharged engine.

The 2002 auto show Sky featured four doors-- two suicide doors behind the front two, following in Saturn tradition. It was to feature a rear light bar, a 2+2 seating arrangement, and a significantly more bulbous exterior, one very far removed from the rather sharp and small-profiled Sky that actually released. It was to be powered by a front-wheel-drive 2.2L supercharged Ecotec 4-cylinder, making 180 hp (134 kW) and 190 lb⋅ft (258 N⋅m) of torque. It was intended to be only about three-quarters the weight of the production Sky while maintaining the spaceframe design motif from the S-Series line.

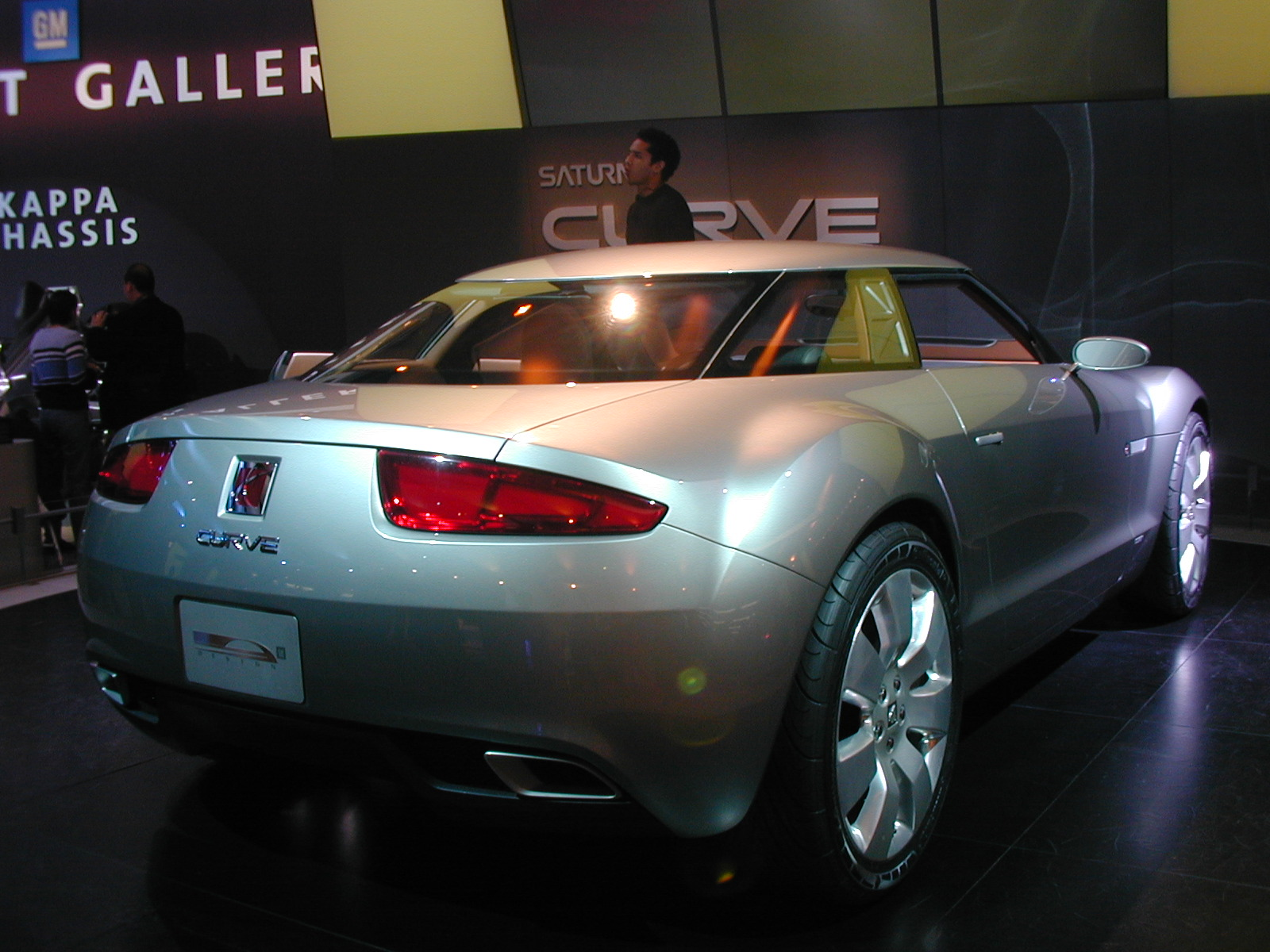
The Saturn Curve featured linework that eventually made its way onto the body of the Saturn Sky.

The Opel Speedster was also a big influence on the Sky, as many of the body lines and styling cues were used to forge the groundwork for the Sky's overall design.

=== Post-concept Sky ===
The Saturn Sky would, upon release, differ greatly from the initial concept. The "Sky" moniker was kept regardless, and Sky was transitioned to act as a softer, more luxurious Solstice, as backed both by its higher price and its softer suspension, rather than a direct, original vehicle.

The Sky never sold as well as the Solstice, peaking at 11,263 units being sold in 2007. Despite this, the Sky tended to be looked upon slightly more favorably, critically speaking, as it had a more "muscular" look than the "doughy" Solstice. Both still received praise for their looks, though the Sky was deemed the more "edgy" of the two. Both took on Corvette comparisons for their similarly-designed platform infrastructure, such as hydroformed frame rails. Both also shared being the first GM vehicles with adjustable rear caster.

=== Solstice GXP ===
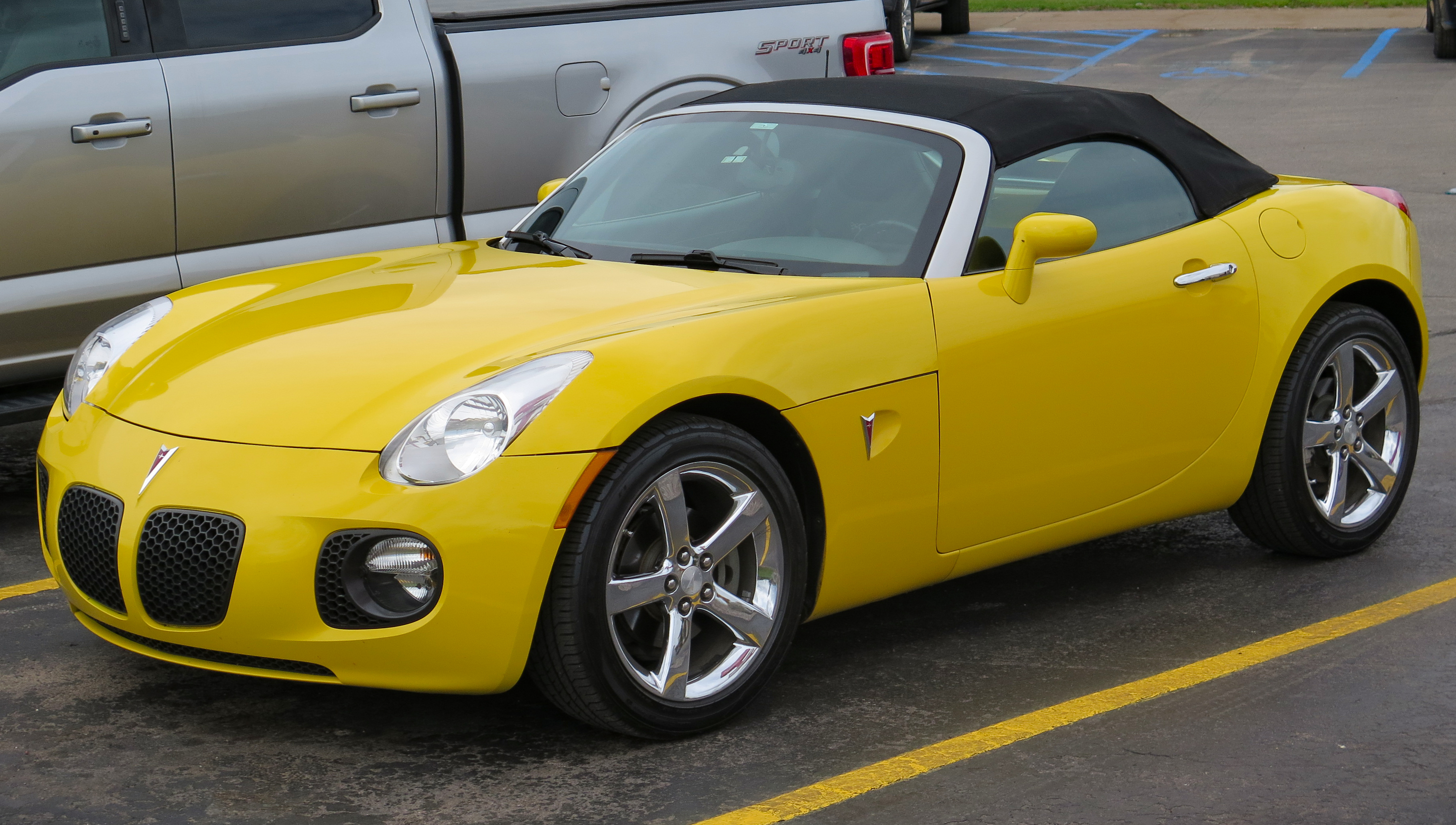
2008 Pontiac Solstice GXP Convertible in "Mean" Yellow

The GXP version of the Solstice debuted at the Los Angeles Auto Show in January 2006. Although heavier than the base model, it made much more power and torque with a new 2.0 liter (121.9 cu in) I4 Ecotec engine equipped with a dual-scroll turbocharger. The engine's output is 260 hp (194 kW) and 260 lb⋅ft (353 N⋅m). This was the highest specific output of any engine by cubic inches in the history of General Motors in North America (2.1 hp or 1.6 kW per cubic inch) and had the first dual-cam VVT system on an Ecotec motor. According to Car and Driver, the GXP targa accelerates from 0 to 60 mph (97 km/h) in 5.2 seconds, while the soft top GXP did so in 5.6 seconds.

Other GXP features include standard StabilTrak traction control, a limited-slip differential, and anti-lock brakes. Summer tires on 18-inch wheels are standard.

=== Sky Red Line ===
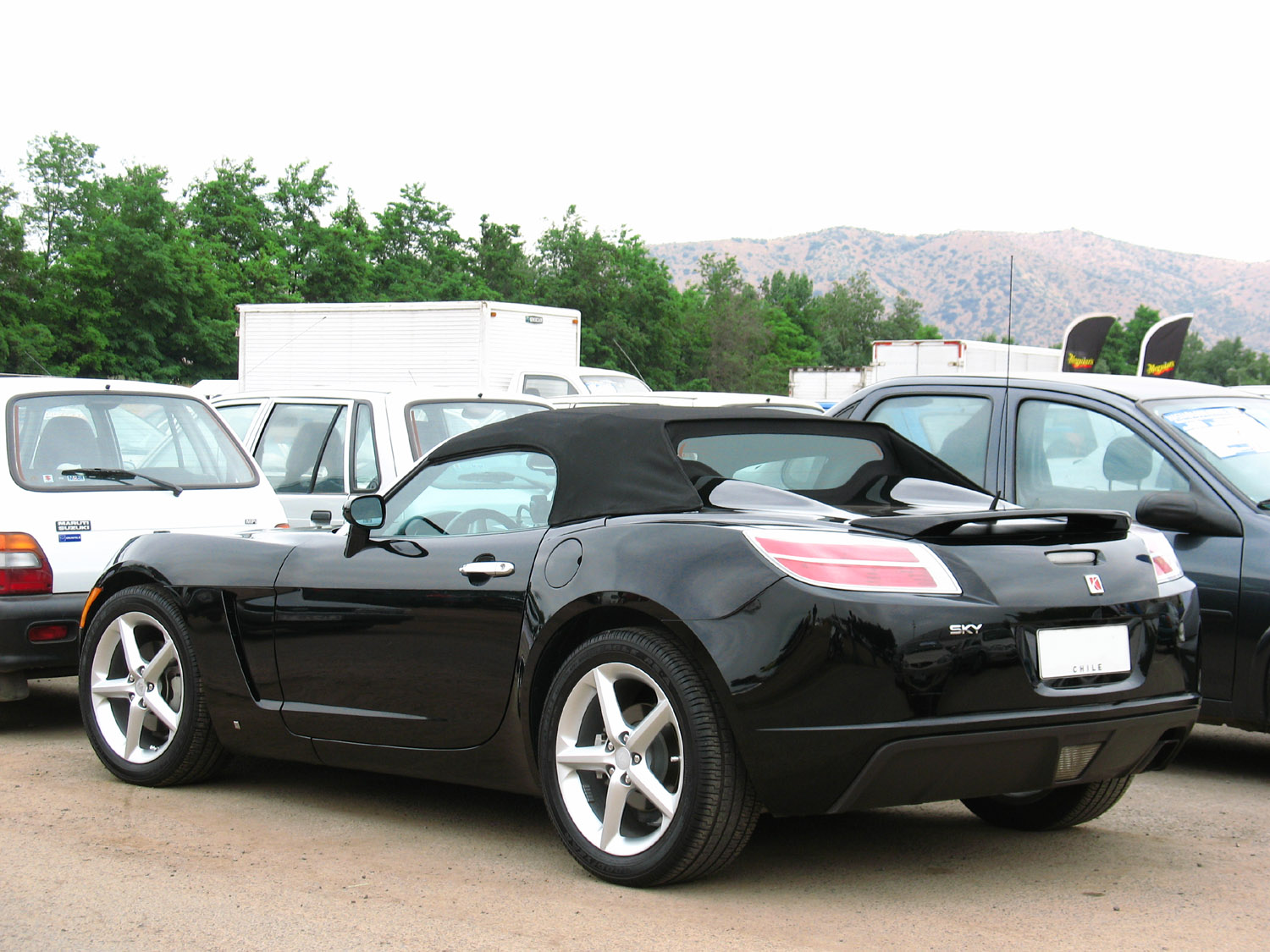
2009 Saturn Sky in Midnight Blue

A Red Line model of the Sky was introduced on April 11, 2006 at the New York Auto Show. It uses the same 260 hp (194 kW) turbocharged Ecotec engine as the Pontiac Solstice, as well as the same standard 5-speed Aisin manual transmission. An automatic transmission is optional.

The Red Line had a standard torque-sensing limited-slip differential, standard StabiliTrak stability control, and an enhanced sport suspension over the standard Sky (available as a dealer-add on for regular models). Other exterior changes included dual tip exhausts, 18-inch wheels, and a specific front fascia modeled for the Red Line. On the inside, the Red Line had a special leather-wrapped steering wheel with audio controls, special embroidery on the seats and floor mats, metallic door sill covers and stainless steel pedals, special tachometer and gauges, and a digital boost gauge in the Driver Information Center. The Red Line model started shipping in the third quarter of 2006, with a retail price starting at $29,795. 2007 Saturn Sky Red Line specifications:

- 0–60 mph (97 km/h): 5.2 seconds
- 0–100 mph (161 km/h): 14.7 seconds
- 1/4 mile: 14.0 seconds at 98 mph (158 km/h)
- Top speed: 141 mph (227 km/h) drag limited
- 70 mph (113 km/h)-0 mph braking: 168 ft (51 m)
- 300 ft (91 m) skidpad: 0.87 g
- EPA fuel economy: 22 mpg_{‑US} (11 L/100 km; 26 mpg_{‑imp}) city/31 mpg_{‑US} (7.6 L/100 km; 37 mpg_{‑imp}) highway

=== GMPP Upgrade ===
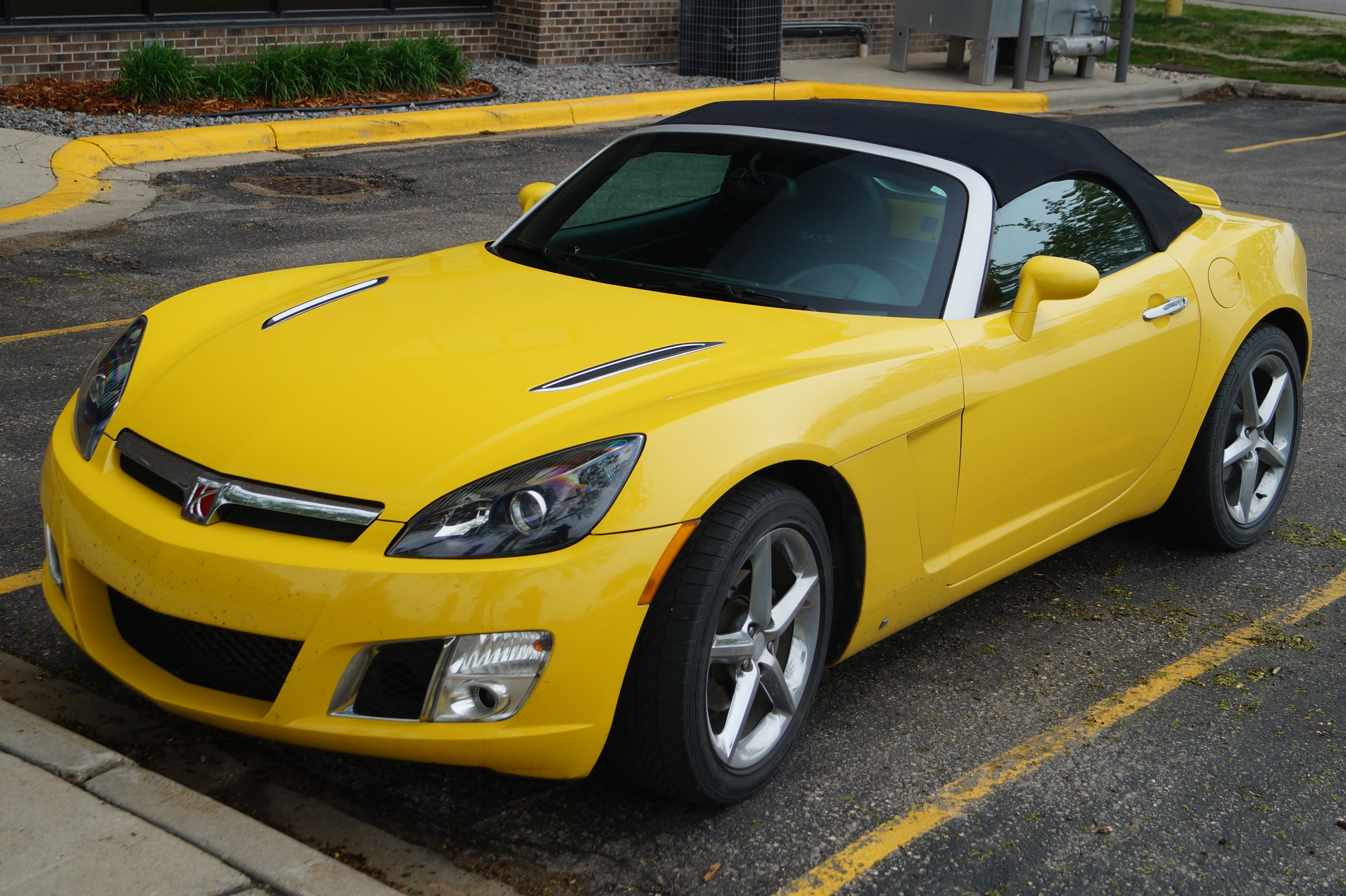
Red Line models and models with the GMPP Stage 1 adjustment have no difference on the exterior. The only differences can be seen in an increased turbo boost pressure limit in the DIC on the dashboard and different MAP sensors under the hood.

An available dealer installed option from 2008 onwards was a modified computer tune and two new sensors that resulted in an increased output to 290 hp (216 kW) and 340 lb⋅ft (461 N⋅m) on manual transmission models and 290 hp (216 kW) and 325 lb⋅ft (441 N⋅m) on automatic transmission models, further enhancing the performance of GXP and Red Line model cars.

Models
Trim	Engine	Power	Torque	Transmission
Base Solstice/Sky	2.4 L LE5 I4	177 hp (132 kW)	173 lb⋅ft (235 N⋅m)	5-speed Aisin AR-5 manual, or 5-speed GM 5L40-E automatic
GXP/Red Line	2.0 L LNF I4	260 hp (194 kW)	260 lb⋅ft (353 N⋅m)	5-speed Aisin AR-5 manual, or 5-speed GM 5L40-E automatic
GXP/Red Line (GMPP Package)	2.0 L LNF I4	290 hp (216 kW)	340 lb⋅ft (461 N⋅m) (Manual) or 325 lb⋅ft (441 N⋅m) (Automatic)	5-speed Aisin AR-5 manual, or 5-speed GM 5L40-E automatic

=== Solstice coupe ===
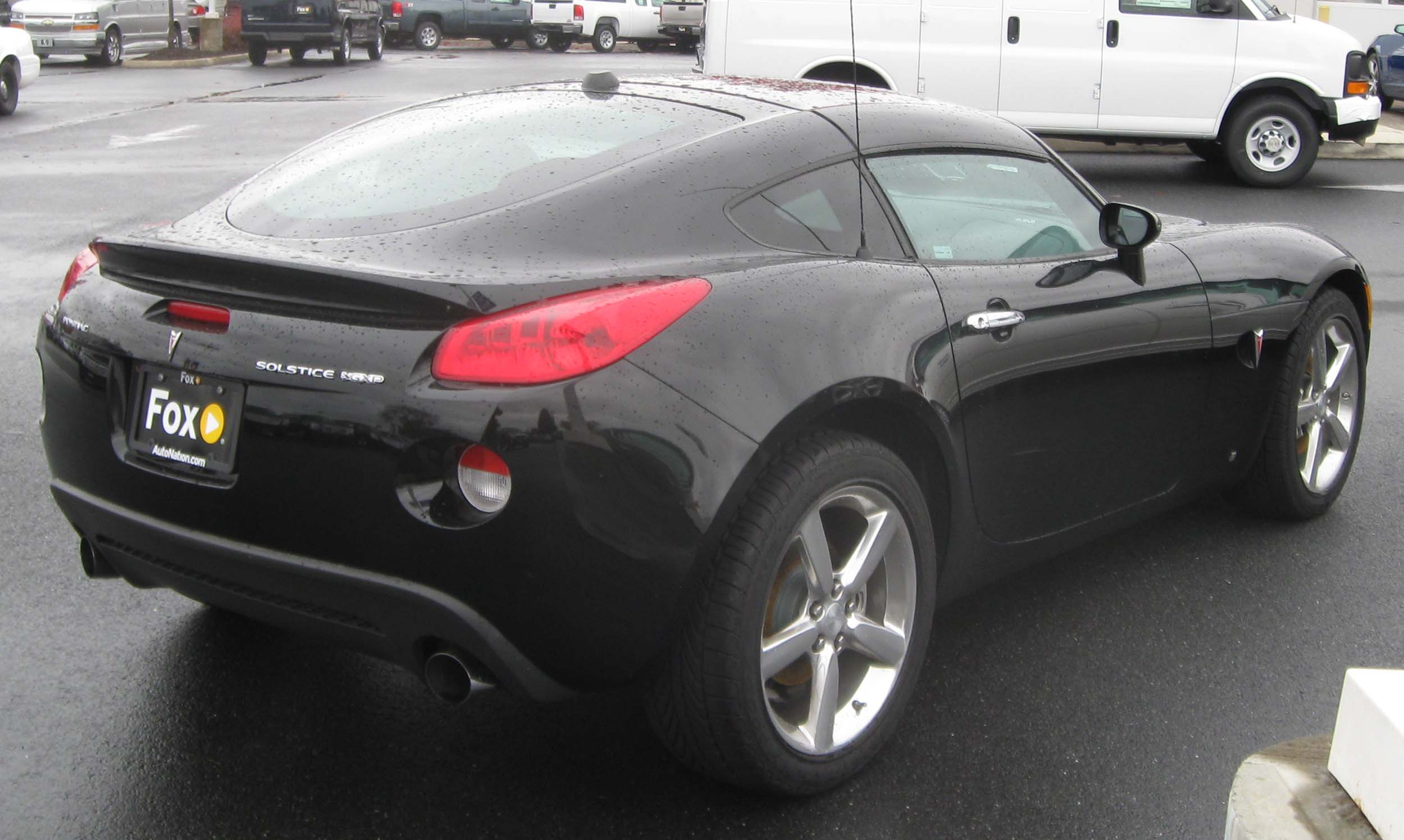
2009 Pontiac Solstice GXP coupe

A coupe version of the Solstice was unveiled at the 2008 New York Auto Show. Engine choices were the same as the convertible versions. The targa-style roof can be removed, but the magnesium-plastic panel roof cannot be fitted into the trunk. An optional cloth top was available for $1100, which can be fitted into the trunk. This option would never be offered for any of the other Kappa variants, which were all exclusively soft-tops.

The car went on sale in early 2009. The Pontiac Solstice coupes are considered to be quite rare: There were a total of 1,266 Solstice coupes that were able to be manufactured before the production line in Wilmington, Delaware, was shut down: 102 pre-production 2009 models, 1,152 sequential vin regular production 2009 models, and 12 pre-production 2010 models. This is in contrast to over 64,000 of the Pontiac Solstice convertibles that were manufactured.

=== Common issues and design flaws ===
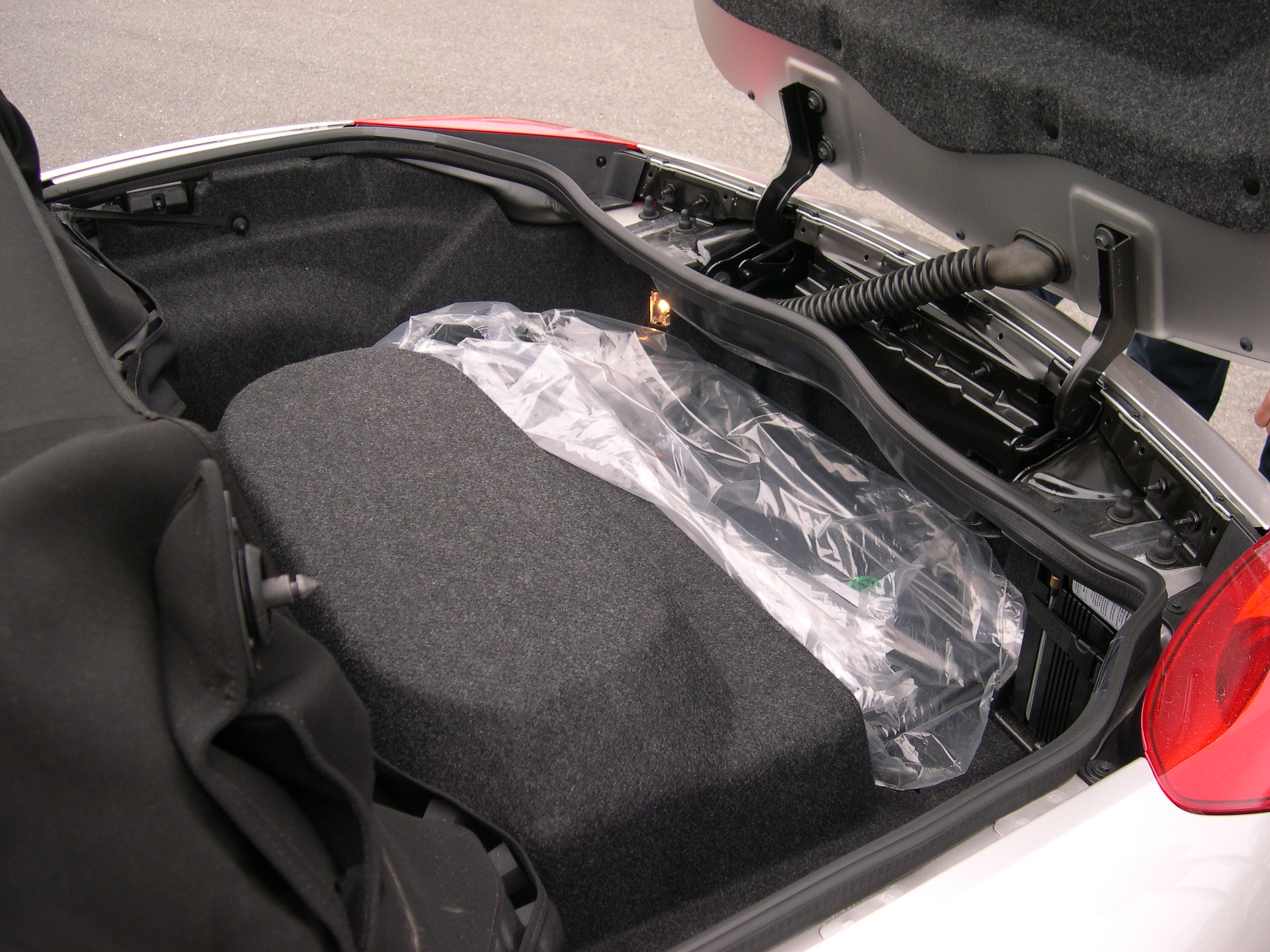
Even without the top stowed, the trunk space was significantly compromised by the position of the fuel tank.

The Solstice and Sky had notable component design and ergonomic issues. Both were considered impractical for day-to-day use, because the soft tops consumed all trunk space when stowed, and the targa's removable hardtop could not safely stow in the trunk. Both the Solstice and Sky were included in an airbag sensor recall across GM which could reduce crash safety. The vehicles have a reputation of low-reliability water pumps and low-quality materials being used for some parts of the powertrain. Quality of life features, such as cupholders, were considered low-durability and undersized. While the cars were recognized as relatively comfortable for their size, interior space was meager. Innocuous on other vehicles, closing the engine hood with a door open or jacking the car without using "pucks", could damage the paint or car body.

=== Discontinuation ===
Following the 2008 economic recession, GM discontinued the Pontiac and Saturn divisions in compliance with their bailout deal with the U.S. government. This is in spite of Lutz's harsh opposition to killing Pontiac (although Saturn was not necessarily as difficult of a loss in his eyes), which turned into a matter of pragmatism, citing poor buyer enthusiasm and longtime unprofitability for its closure. In April 2009, after GM announced the discontinuation of the Pontiac brand by the end of 2010, CEO Fritz Henderson stated that the Solstice would not continue under another GM brand. Although they considered selling the Wilmington plant and the Solstice/Sky products to an outside business, the Wilmington assembly plant closed in July 2009, ending production but allowing for a few 2009-produced Solstice and Sky models marked as 2010 models to be produced and sold. In October 2009, the new DeLorean Motor Company expressed interest in continuing production of the Solstice, going so far as to release concept artwork for a 2011 DeLorean Solstice. These plans were shelved shortly thereafter, when Fisker Automotive instead acquired the Wilmington Assembly where the Solstice was produced.

=== Overall production and sales for the Solstice ===
Calendar year	Total produced	Total American sales
2005		5,445
2006	21,273	19,710
2007	24,018	16,782
2008	15,587	10,739
2009	4,826	5,642
2010	20	157
Total	65,724	58,475

Sales by color of all 1,266 Pontiac Solstice coupes manufactured:

- 1 Unit - "Santiago" teal metallic (specific to Canadian market - color new for 2010)
- 26 Units - "Fresh" hydro blue - paint code 22U (USA 25 inc. 1 heritage Ed. /CAN 1/MEX 0) 2%
- 37 Units - "Mean" yellow - paint code 34U (USA 29/CAN 4/MEX 4) 3%
- 39 Units - "Deep" blue - paint code 48U (USA 35/CAN 1/MEX 3) 3%
- 58 Units - "Brazen" orange metallic - paint code 28U (USA 35/CAN 8/MEX 15) 4%
- 58 Units - "Sly" steel gray - paint code 75U (USA 50/CAN 8/MEX 0) 4%
- 77 Units - "Pure" white - paint code 50U (USA 63 inc. 1 Heritage Ed. /CAN 2/MEX 12) 6%
- 148 Units - "Aggressive" red - paint code 74U (USA 126/CAN 8/MEX 14) 12%
- 213 Units - "Cool" silver - paint code 67U (USA 154/CAN 16/MEX 43) 17%
- 221 Units - "Wicked" ruby red metallic - paint code 79U (USA 195/CAN 10/MEX 16) 18%
- 388 Units - "Mysterious" black - paint code 41U (USA 345/CAN 28/MEX 15) 31%

=== Overall production and sales for the Sky ===
Calendar year	Total produced	Total American sales
2006		8,671
2007	16,504	11,263
2008	13,542	9,162
2009	4,176	3,399
2010	8	179
Total	34,230	32,674

== Saturn Sky ==
Saturn Sky
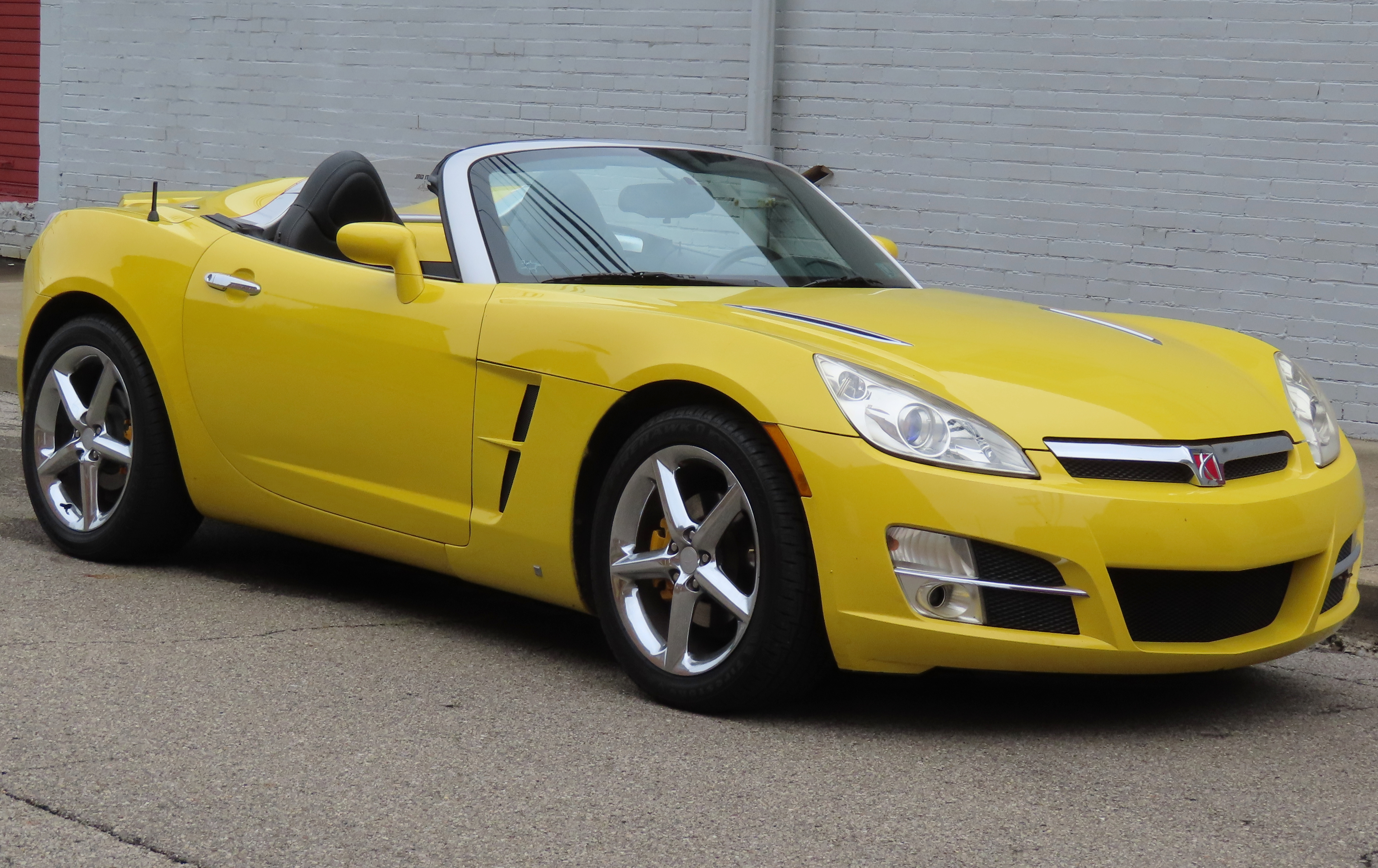
- 2007 Saturn Sky

Overview
- Manufacturer: General Motors
- Also called: Opel GT; Daewoo G2X
- Production: 2006–2009
- Model years: 2007–2010
- Assembly: United States: Wilmington, Delaware (Wilmington Assembly)
- Designer: Franz von Holzhausen

Body and chassis
- Class: Sports car
- Body style: 2-door roadster
- Layout: Front mid-engine, rear-wheel-drive
- Platform: GM Kappa platform/GMX023
- Related: Pontiac Solstice

Powertrain
- Engine: 2.0 L Ecotec LNF turbo I4; 2.4 L Ecotec LE5 I4
- Transmission: 5-speed Aisin AR5 manual; 5-speed 5L40-E automatic

Dimensions
- Wheelbase: 95.1 in (2,416 mm)
- Length: 161.1 in (4,092 mm)
- Width: 71.4 in (1,814 mm)
- Height: 50.2 in (1,275 mm)
- Curb weight: 2,940 lb (1,330 kg) (Base); 3,071 lb (1,393 kg) (Red Line)

The Saturn Sky was Saturn's rebadge of the Solstice, and was initially released in the first quarter of 2006 as a 2007 model. It uses the Kappa automobile platform alongside the Solstice. The Sky concept was shown at the 2005 North American International Auto Show, with the production version following at the 2006 show. It was built at GM's Wilmington Assembly plant in Wilmington, Delaware, alongside the Solstice. The Sky featured 18-inch wheels and a 2.4 L (146 cu in) Ecotec LE5 inline-four engine with direct injection and variable valve timing that produced 177 hp (132 kW), a new 2.0-liter turbocharged direct injected inline-four engine also featuring VVT that made 260 hp (194 kW) and 260 lb⋅ft (353 N⋅m). An optional dealer-installed MAP sensor and ECM flash upgrade kit was also available for the Red Line model from 2008 onwards. (Note: It would raise the power to 290 hp (216 kW), with manual transmission models outputting 340 lb⋅ft (461 N⋅m) of torque and automatic transmission models outputting 325 lb⋅ft (441 N⋅m) of torque.) Both five-speed manual and automatic transmissions were available.

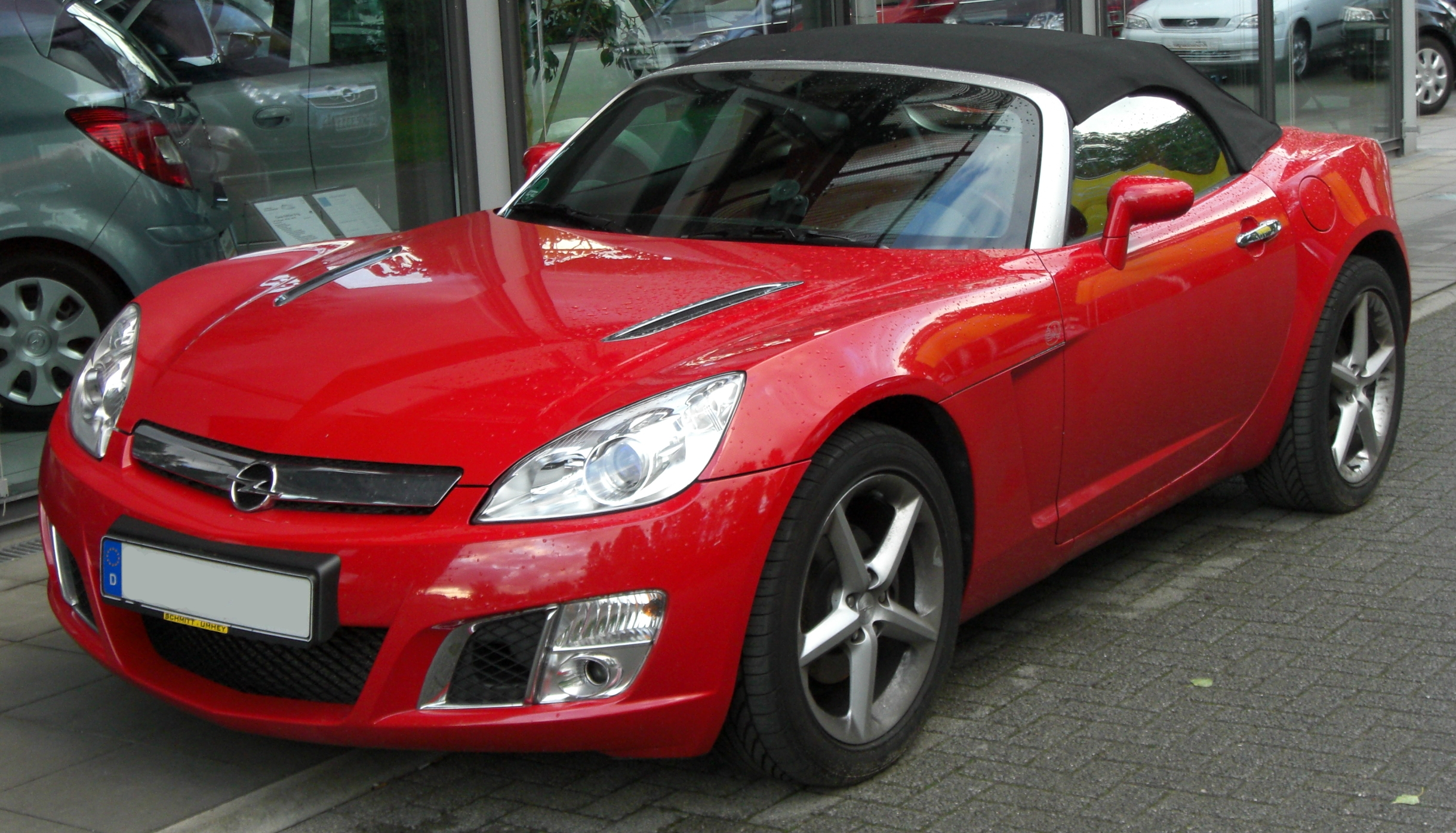
Opel GT

The styling for the Sky, penned by Franz von Holzhausen, was based on the Opel VX Lightning concept car's design. It was available in some European markets as the Opel GT, which acted as a follow-up to the Opel Speedster, but was not released in the British market like the Speedster, as it was not intended to be right-hand drive from factory. A rebadged version named the Daewoo G2X was unveiled as a concept vehicle for the South Korean market in 2006, then released for sale in September 2007. The price of the G2X was nearly double the price of the Sky and Solstice as sold in the United States, likely due to tariffs and cost of shipping from the Wilmington plant.

The Wilmington Assembly plant closed in July 2009, ending production as both the Pontiac and Saturn nameplates were retired.

2007 Saturn Sky (base model) specifications:

- 0–60 mph (97 km/h): 6.9 seconds
- 0–100 mph (161 km/h): 21.9 seconds
- 1/4 mile: 15.2 seconds at 88 mph (142 km/h)
- Top speed: 123 mph (198 km/h) drag limited
- 70 mph (113 km/h)-0 mph braking: 174 ft (53 m)
- 300 ft (91 m) skidpad: 0.86 g
- EPA fuel economy: 20 mpg_{‑US} (12 L/100 km; 24 mpg_{‑imp}) city/28 mpg_{‑US} (8.4 L/100 km; 34 mpg_{‑imp}) highway

== Differences between the Solstice and the Sky ==
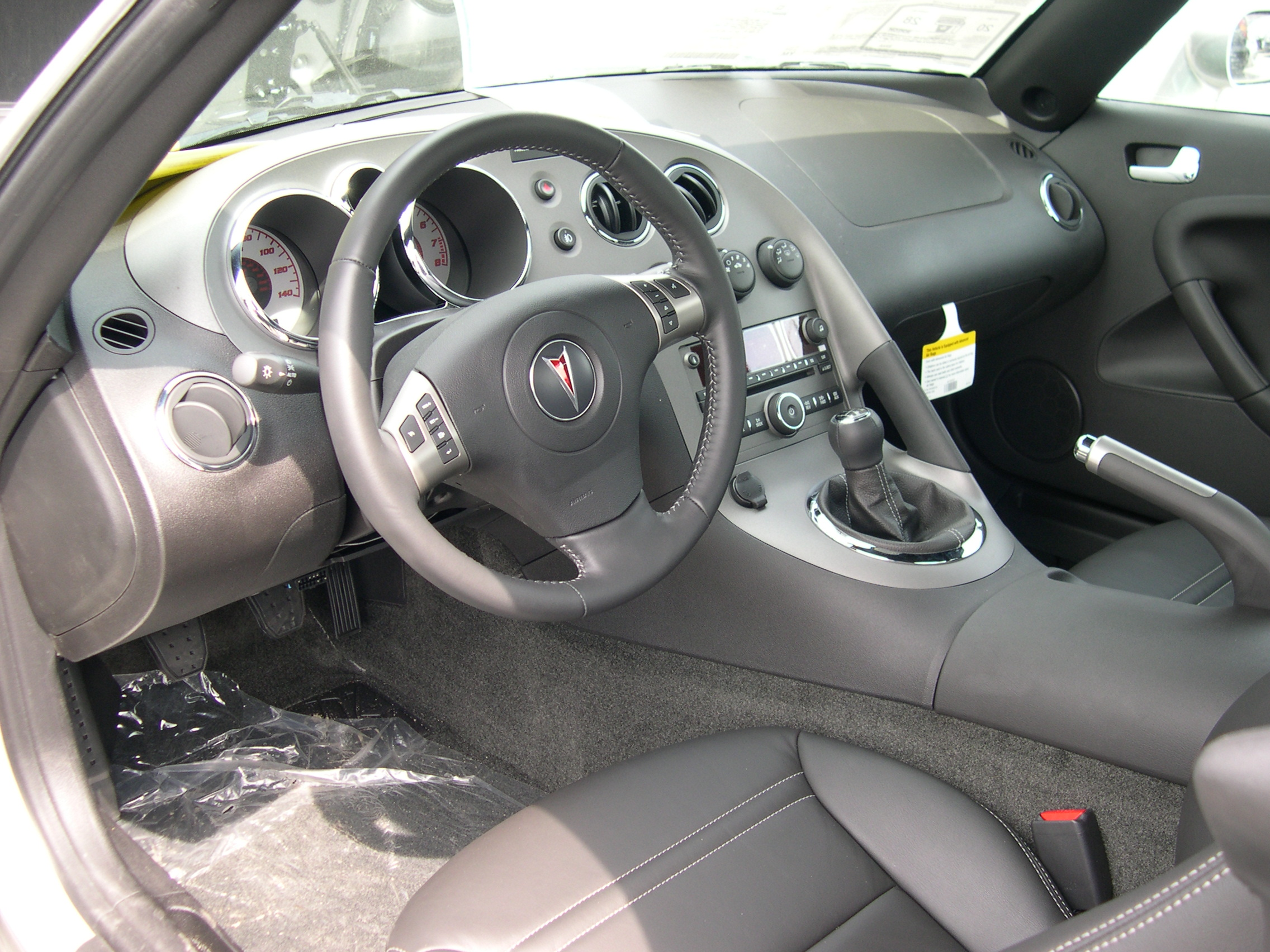
Interior of a 2006 Pontiac Solstice

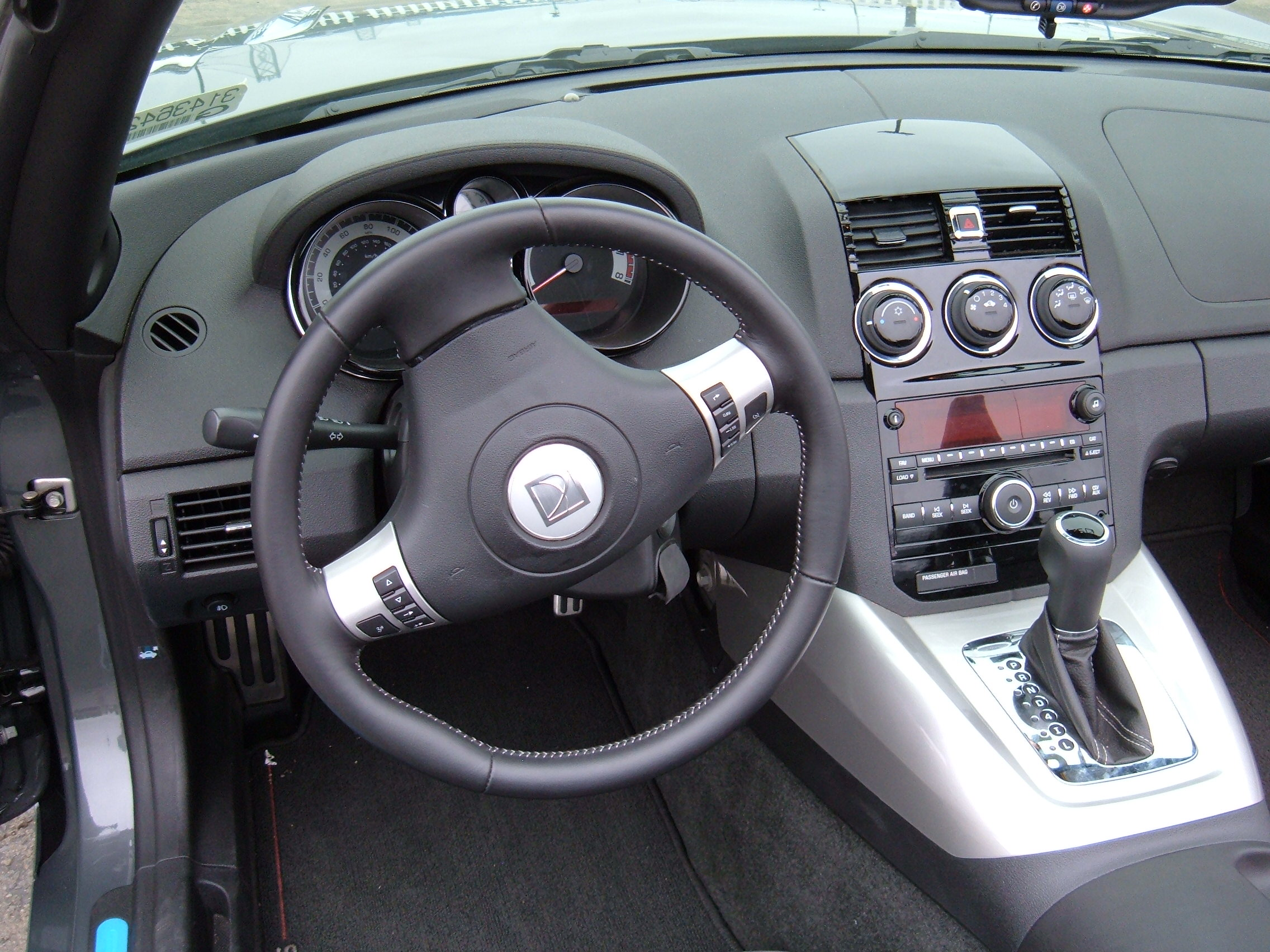
Saturn Sky Red Line interior

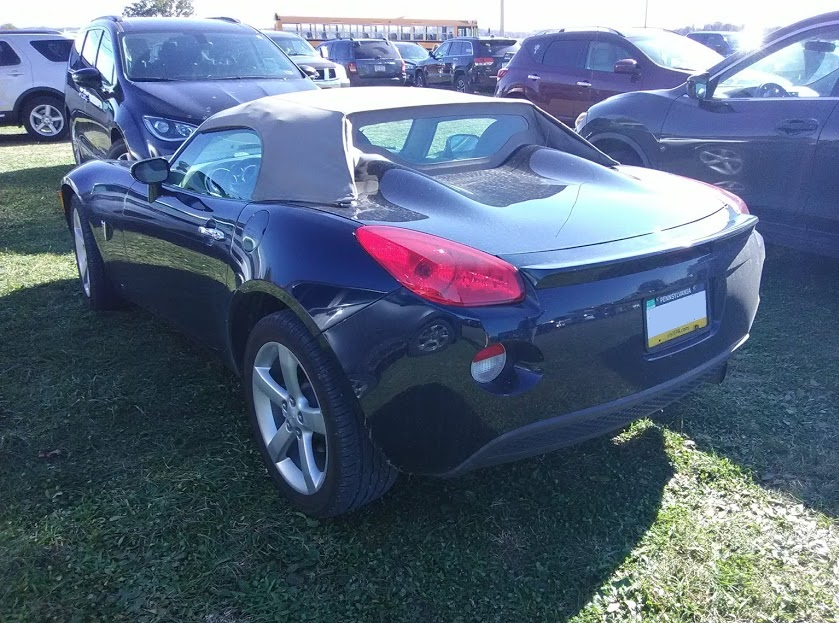
The Solstice, sporting a flatter, simpler spoiler

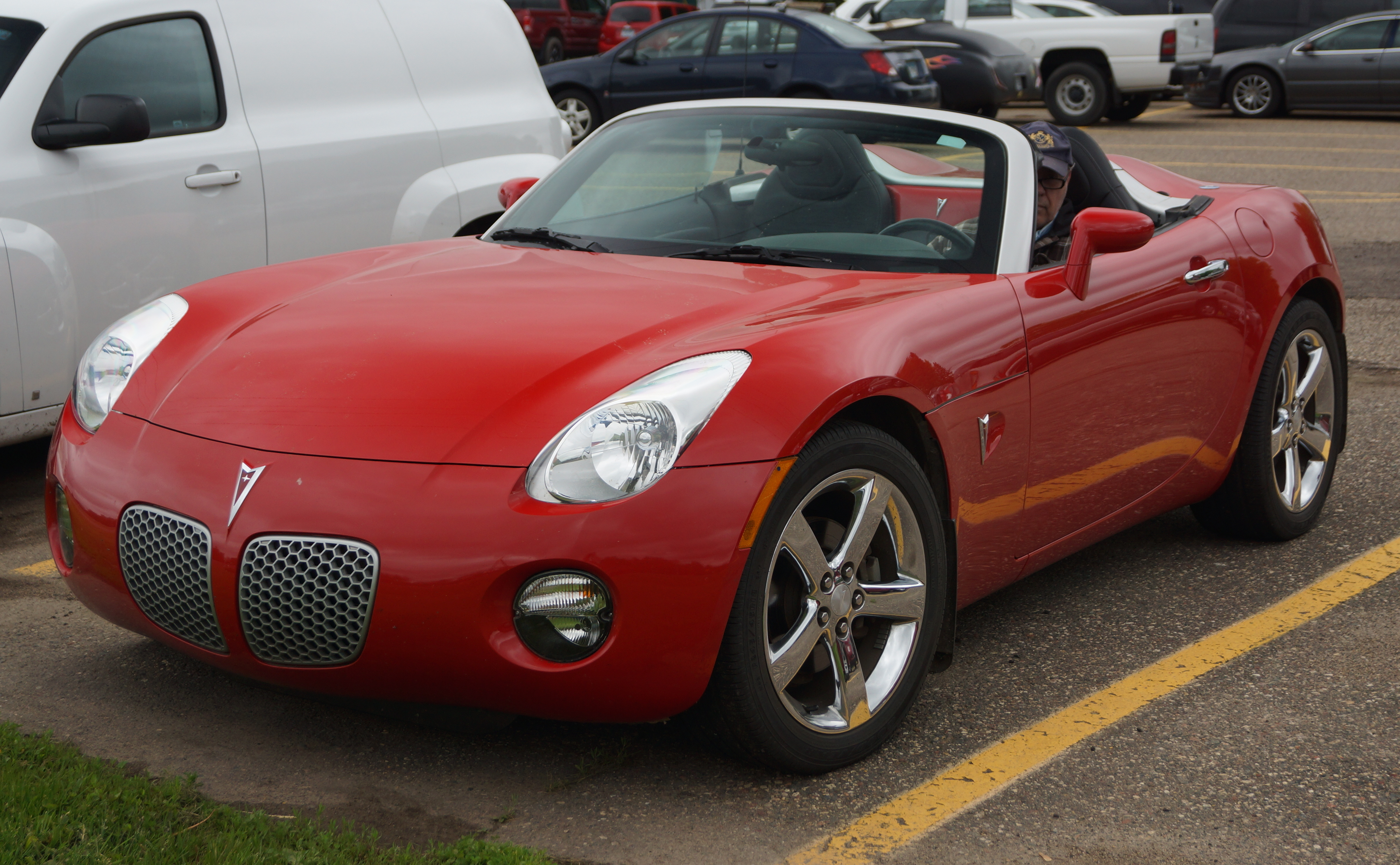
2007 Pontiac Solstice

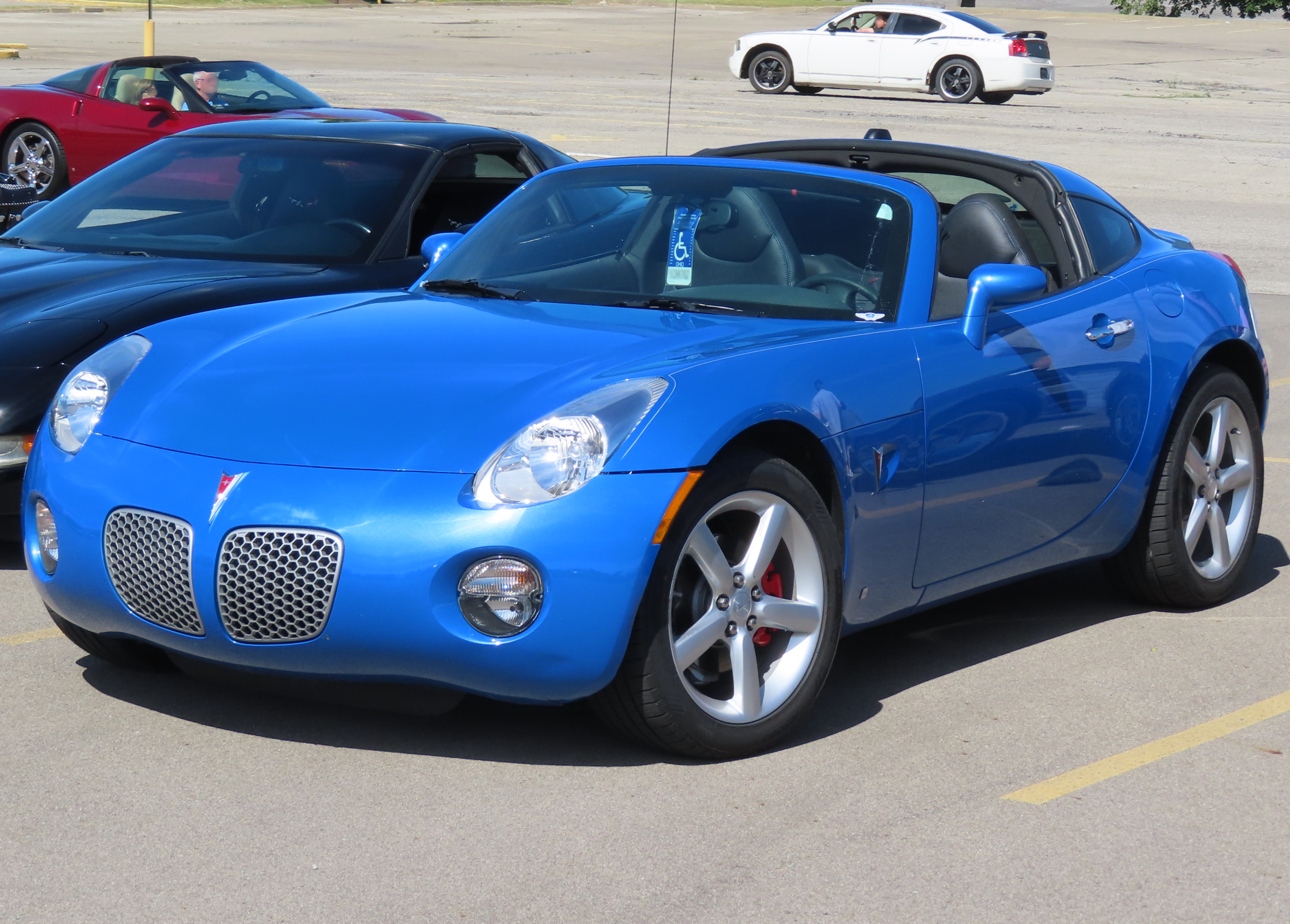
The Solstice targa coupe, with the targa top removed

=== Interior ===
Whereas the Solstice's interior created a cluster of functions in a rightwards motion stemming from the steering wheel, the Sky's interior favored a more thinly-spread, traditional layout of buttons placed all across the vehicle. The Sky featured one fewer hand-hold than the Solstice, instead placing the vehicle's electrical socket nearby the lost appendage. The vehicles had differing shifters, gauges, air vents, power window/mirror/lock control placements, and different placements of the passenger airbag notifier in addition to the dissimilar button placements.

The Sky was marketed as being more luxurious than the Solstice, offering power windows, traction control, cruise control, keyless entry, leather steering wheel wrap, fog lights, StabiliTrak, and a limited-slip differential as standard equipment — all optional on the Solstice. Conversely, the Solstice was "perceived to be generally more sleek than its Saturn counterpart, with a sportier feel that put more emphasis on performance."

=== Exterior ===
Both the Solstice and the Sky shared their platform, engine, and transmission, as well as numerous other parts from other General Motors models.

The Saturn Sky exhibited slightly different badge positioning and nomenclature to the Solstice, opting for no front quarter panel badging, a badge mounted to the front fascia, rear badges reading "SKY" and "TURBO" with no mention of the brand's name, only the Red Line badge preceding "SKY" on the left and the Saturn badge in the center beneath the third brake light.

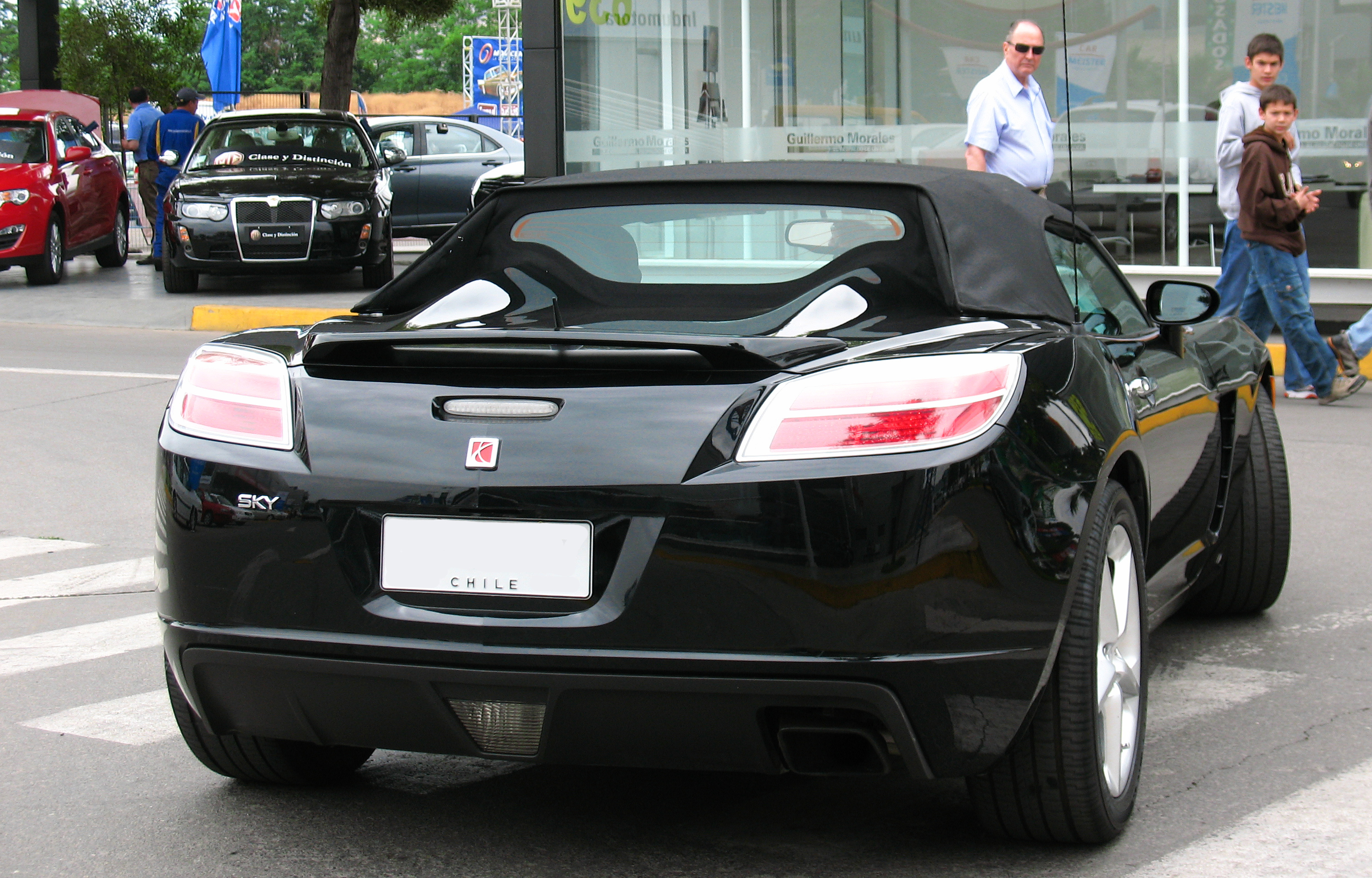
The rear of a Sky, with taller wing

The optional spoilers for both were mounted and shaped unlike one another, with the Sky's being called European-inspired (albeit often erroneously thought of as actually being a European-first car for its appearances, among other reasons.) The Solstice had a visibly smaller spoiler, excepting the "ducktail" featured on the coupe model. The Sky had an alternate rear fascia to the Solstice, showing a lower singular reverse light and smooth rather than dotted plastic. The side brake lights had chrome outlines and the third brake light was colored white instead of red. Exhaust tips were also different, as the Sky's were rectangular instead of circular.

While both the Sky and Solstice were offered as drop-top convertibles, the Solstice was also offered in a coupe body style with either a fabric or removable magnesium targa top.

== Parts sharing ==
The sharing of technology and various components is a common practice among automakers, resulting in reduced parts costs. The Solstice shares major components with nearly every GM division:

- The rear axle and differential are from the Sigma-based Cadillac CTS
- The passenger side front airbag, steering column, and exterior and interior door handles are from the Chevrolet Cobalt
- The reverse light assembly is from the GMC Envoy
- The heating, ventilating, and air conditioning modules are from the Hummer H3
- The front fog lamp assembly is from the Pontiac Grand Prix
- Steering components, such as the wheel and column, also featured in the Pontiac G5, Chevrolet Corvette, and Chevrolet Cobalt
- The 2.4 L Ecotec engine is shared with the Pontiac G6, Chevrolet Cobalt, Chevrolet Malibu, and Chevrolet HHR
- The five-speed manual transmission is the same as in the Hummer H3, GMC Canyon, and Chevrolet Colorado
- The five-speed automatic is identical to those of the Cadillac CTS, STS, and SRX

== Other models ==
=== Daewoo G2X ===
Daewoo had already shown a version of the Opel Speedster called the Daewoo Speedster, but this remained a one-off. In 2006, they showed a show car called the Daewoo G2X; simply a rebadge of the Saturn Sky. In September 2007 it was available for Purchase in the South Korean market. Some sources would erroneously claim the G2X featured a V4 engine configuration, which is untrue, as the G2X came with the same LNF engine as the Pontiac Solstice GXP, Saturn Sky Red Line, and Opel GT. It remained on sale until early 2009 and 179 examples were delivered in total. Similarly to the Opel GT, the South Korean G2X was only offered with the turbocharged 264 PS (194 kW) LNF engine from the Sky Red Line, combined with the five-speed automatic transmission.

=== Carbon Flash Special Edition Saturn Sky ===
For the 2008 model year, GM offered the Carbon Flash Special Edition Saturn Sky. Unlike the two Limited Edition models launched later in 2009, its production was slightly higher at 550 units. The Carbon Flash Special Edition featured a unique metallic Carbon Flash paint color, removable silver racing stripe standard, and Monsoon premium audio standard. The largest differentiator, however, is Carbon Flash Edition's silver inserts in the interior seating and steering wheel that provide a black-on-silver appearance.

=== Ruby Red Special Edition and Hydro Blue Limited Edition ===
For the 2009 model year, GM launched two limited-edition Saturn Sky roadsters jointly; Ruby Red Special Edition and Hydro Blue Limited Edition. Both are VIN-coded and some blue books track it as a limited-edition vehicle. All limited editions featured Monsoon premium stereos.

The Ruby Red Edition featured the Ruby Red color and a unique, removable carbon racing stripe that was exclusive to the 500 Sky units produced in this trim.

The Hydro Blue Edition featured a Hydro Blue color, as well as matching blue-colored stitching in the seats and gear shifter. Also, the word Sky stitched into the seats is changed to matching-blue color as well. All Hydro Blue Edition Saturn Sky units were sold with the removable silver racing stripe.

GM had planned to make 500 Hydro Blue units to match the 500 Ruby Red Special Edition Sky build count. However, Hydro Blue units were being built as GM was declaring bankruptcy, resulting in the immediate termination of the Kappa platform. As such, only 89 Hydro Blue Edition Saturn Sky roadsters were built.

The Hydro Blue paint color (and seat/shifter blue stitching) was offered on the Pontiac Solstice. However, it is not VIN coded as a unique/limited edition, racing stripes were not standard, and seats do not have blue-colored lettering. Hydro Blue is the rarest color in all three vehicles; Sky Roadster, Solstice Roadster, and Solstice Coupe.

== Safety ==
NHTSA crash test ratings (2007):

- Frontal Crash Test – Driver:
- Frontal Crash Test – Passenger:
- Side Impact Rating – Driver:
- Rollover Rating:

== Concepts ==
=== Weekend Club Racer concept ===
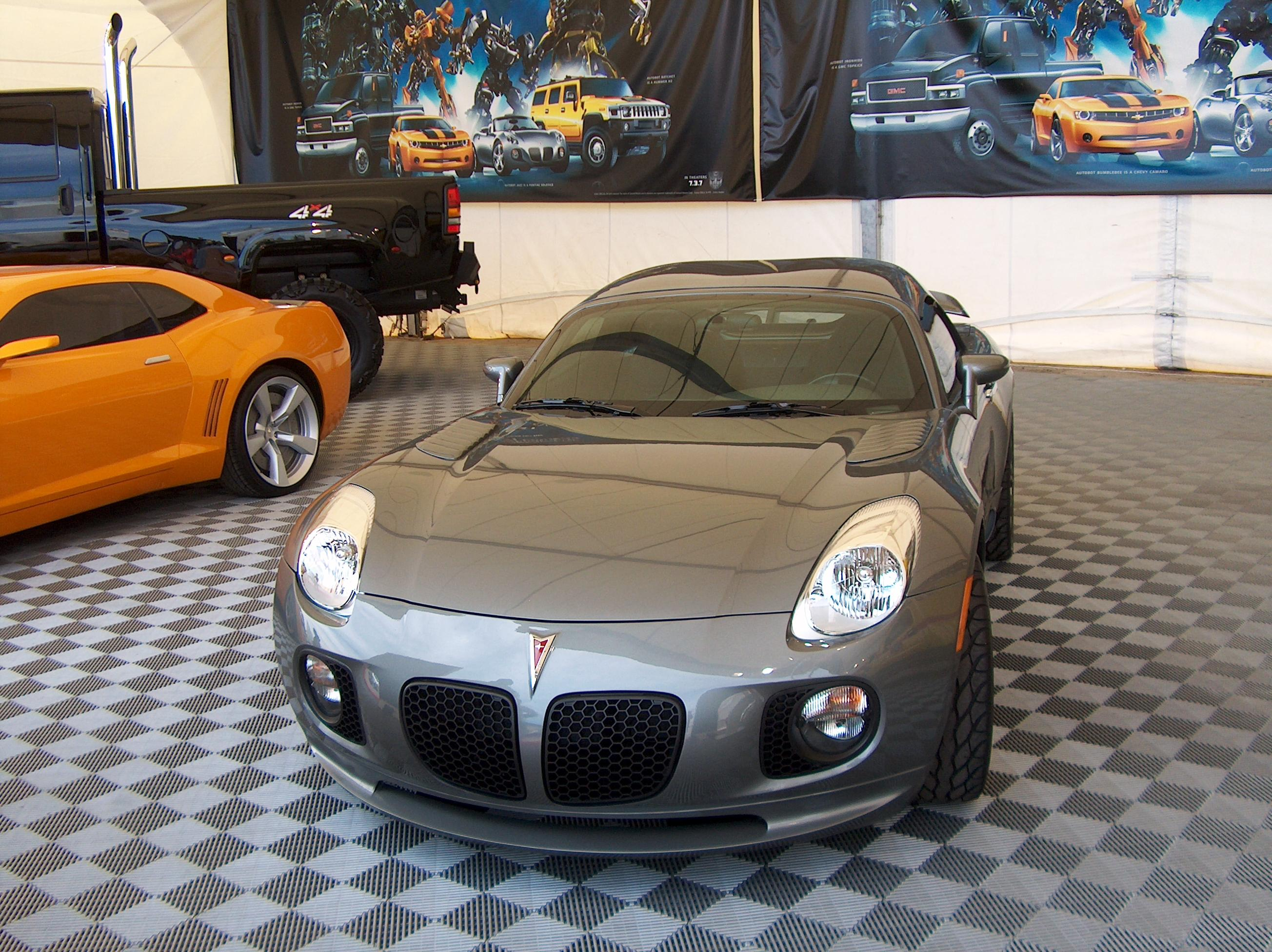
The custom Pontiac Solstice that represents Jazz's alternate mode at the General Motors at the 2007 Detroit River Walk

Built by GM Performance Division, this special Solstice features a removable hardtop, an aggressive body kit, and an oversized spoiler. It featured a turbo I4 engine rated at 325 hp (242 kW), 18-inch wheels with Goodyear Eagle F1 255/45ZR18 tires, a cat-back performance exhaust system, a T-2 race suspension package, and larger diameter disc brakes. The car was unveiled at the 2005 SEMA Show. This vehicle is featured as Jazz in the 2007 film Transformers.

=== GXP-R concept ===
The GXP-R concept is a modified GXP with an engine rated 300 hp (224 kW) and 315 lb⋅ft (427 N⋅m) of torque. It includes an SSBC Performance Brake Package and 19-inch x 8.5-inch wheels with Goodyear Eagle F1 245/40ZR19 tires.

The car was unveiled at the 2006 SEMA Show.

=== SD-290 race concept ===
The SD-290 race concept is a single-seat Solstice GXP with engine rated 290 hp (216 kW). Weight is reduced by installing driver-side only windscreen and elimination of door glass/hardware, convertible top/hardware, HVAC system and wiper system. It includes Solo Performance cat-back exhaust system, KW Automotive coil-over suspension package, 6-piston aluminum calipers with 13-inch (330 mm) rotors from Stainless Steel Brake Company, forged 19-inch wheels with Hoosier R6 racing tire, rear spoiler, removable racing-style steering wheel, racing seat with four-point safety harness, chrome fire extinguisher, Pegasus center console gauge package, and a driver's roll bar.

The car was unveiled at the 2006 SEMA Show.

=== Solstice GXP Coupe concept ===
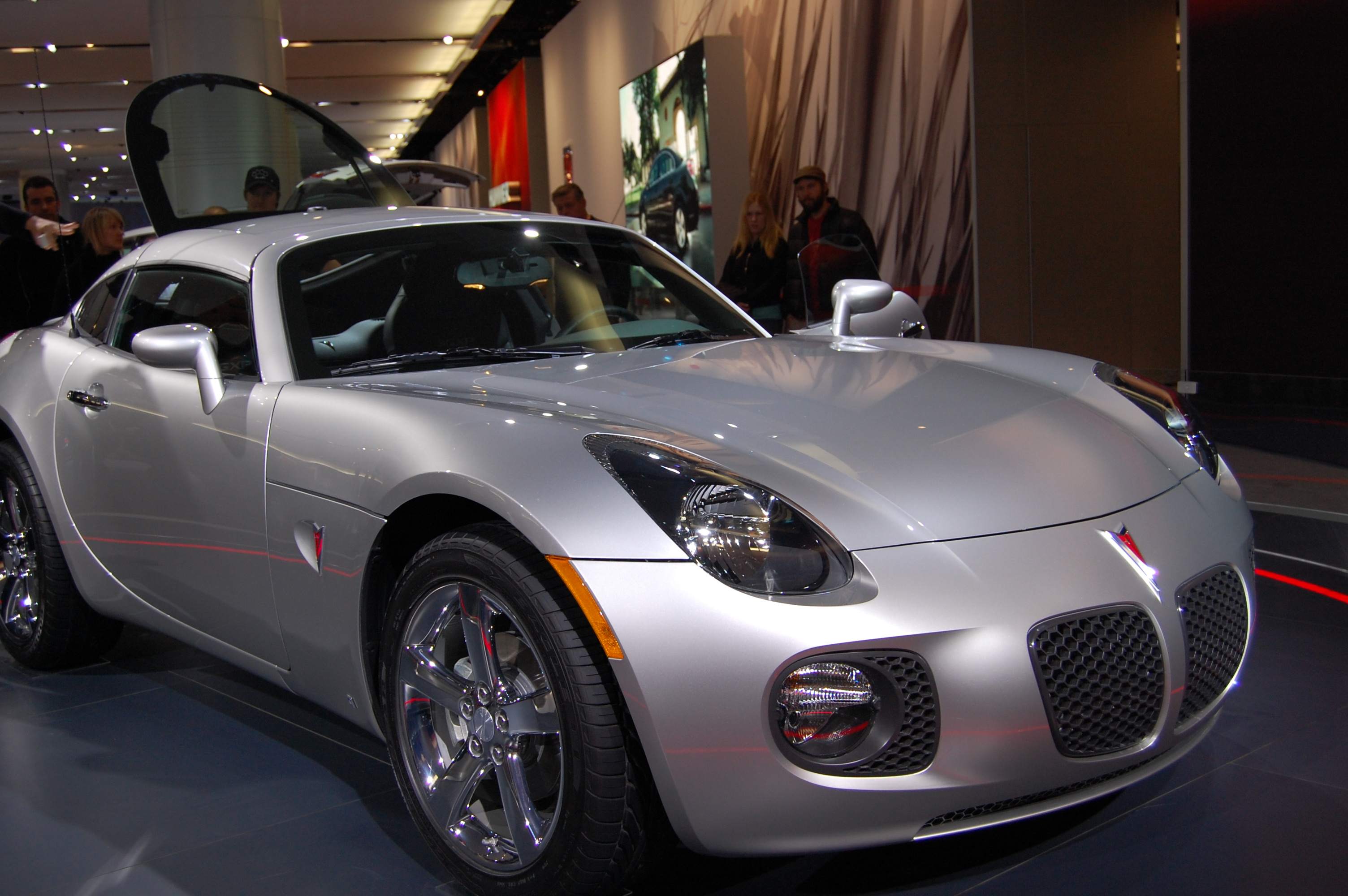
The Pontiac Solstice Coupe at the 2009 North American International Auto Show

The Solstice GXP Coupe concept is based on the GXP coupe. It is equipped with a GM Performance Parts Stage 2 performance kit and a performance air intake kit, which boosts engine power to about 290 hp (216 kW). The car also includes a GM Performance Parts cat-back exhaust system and race-ready suspension kit, polished factory wheels. The first version of the Coupe Concept was a metallic orange.

The car was unveiled at the 2008 SEMA Show.

== Motorsport ==
- Ryan Tuerck used to drive a Mobil 1 Pontiac Solstice fielded by Gardella Racing. Ryan Tuerck won the 2008 Formula Drift Driver of the Year award and finished 2nd in points for the 2009 season. The Pontiac Solstice Tuerck drove has over 500 hp and built off the stock LSJ engine found in the 2004-2007 Saturn Ion Red Line and 2005-2007 Chevrolet Cobalt SS.
- SCCA Club Racing 2006 National Championship Runoffs the Pontiac Solstice placed first place in Showroom Stock B (SSB).
- SCCA Club Racing 2007 National Championship Runoffs the Pontiac Solstice (two base, one GXP) placed 1st (driven by Don Knowles), 2nd, and 3rd place in Touring 2 (T2) and the Pontiac Solstice placed first in Showroom Stock B (SSB).
- SCCA Club Racing 2008 National Championship the Pontiac Solstice GXP placed 1st, 2nd, and 3rd place in Touring 2 (T2).
- SCCA Club Racing 2009 National Championship Runoffs the Pontiac Solstice GXP driven by Don Knowles won the Touring 2 category.

== Notes ==
20. The Pontiac Solstice Book. Author Gary Witzenburg. Publisher Lamm-Morada Publishing Co. Inc., Publishing Date 2006.
