= Cadillac CTS =

Mid-size luxury car by Cadillac (2003–2019)

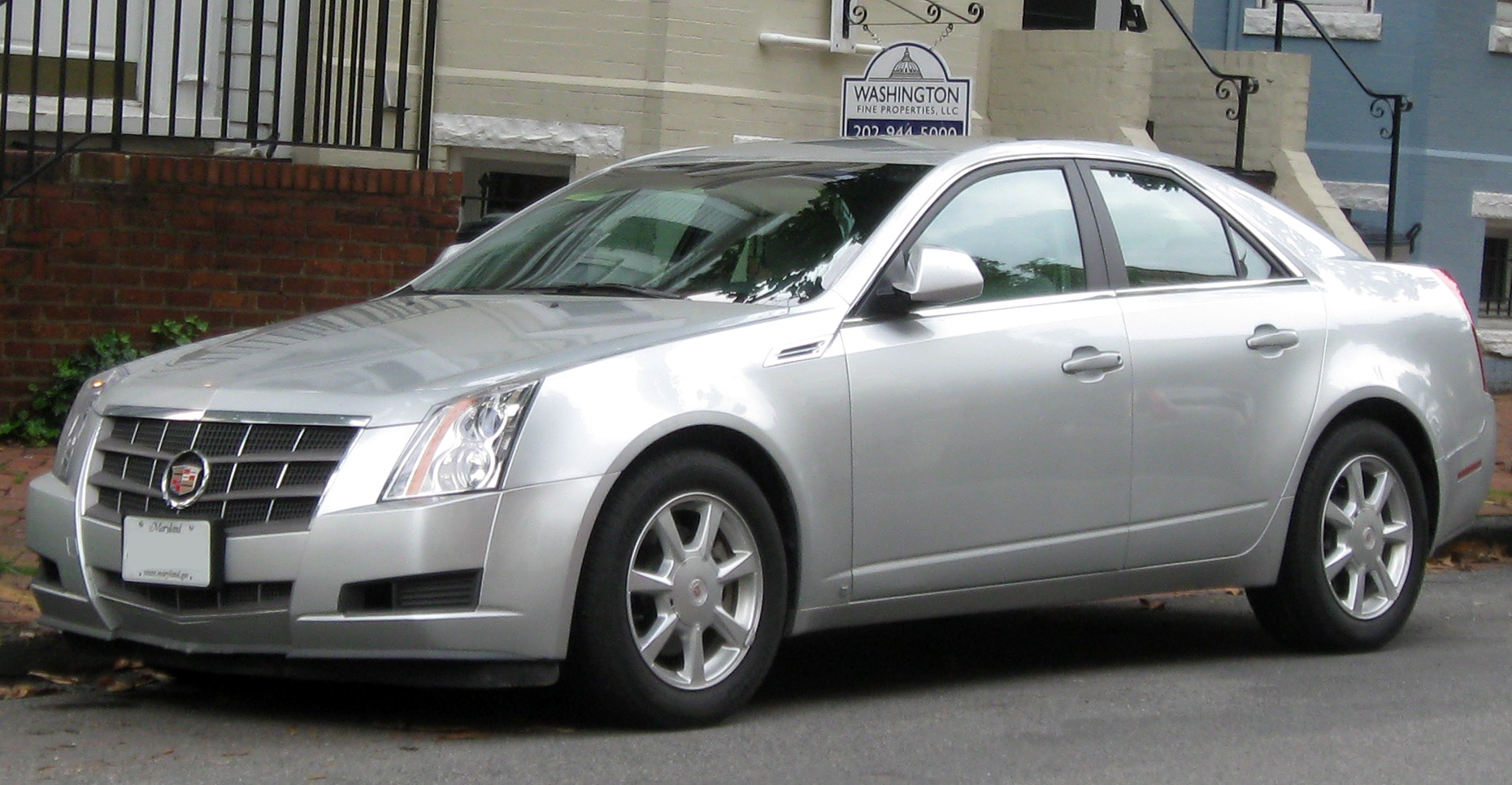
- Second-generation CTS

Overview
- Manufacturer: General Motors
- Production: 2002–2019
- Model years: 2003–2019

Body and chassis
- Class: Mid-size luxury car (E); Grand tourer (S) (CTS Coupe)

Chronology
- Predecessor: Cadillac Catera
- Successor: Cadillac CT5

The Cadillac CTS is a luxury car manufactured and marketed by General Motors under the Cadillac brand from 2002 until 2019 across three generations. Initially available as a 4-door sedan using the GM Sigma platform, GM offered the second-generation CTS as a 4-door sedan, 2-door coupe, and 5-door sport wagon, and the third generation as a sedan, using a stretched version of the GM Alpha platform. High performance sedan variants were offered for each generation as the CTS-V, with wagon and coupe variants offered for the second generation.

The first-generation CTS marked a $4 billion investment by General Motors to set a new course for Cadillac styling, introduce a new rear-drive platform, and most importantly, re-establish the brand's relevancy. Wayne Cherry and Kip Wasenko designed the exterior of the first-generation CTS, marking the production debut of its "Art and Science" design language first used on the Evoq concept car, and developed with key contributions from Thomas Kearns and Mike Torpey. John Manoogian II directed the second-generation CTS design, as initially conceived by Robert Munson. Bob Boniface and Robin Krieg designed the exterior of the third-generation CTS.

The CTS ended production in 2019 and was replaced by the CT5, which shared its platform with the third and final generation of the CTS in addition to the smaller CT4.

== First generation (2003) ==
First generation
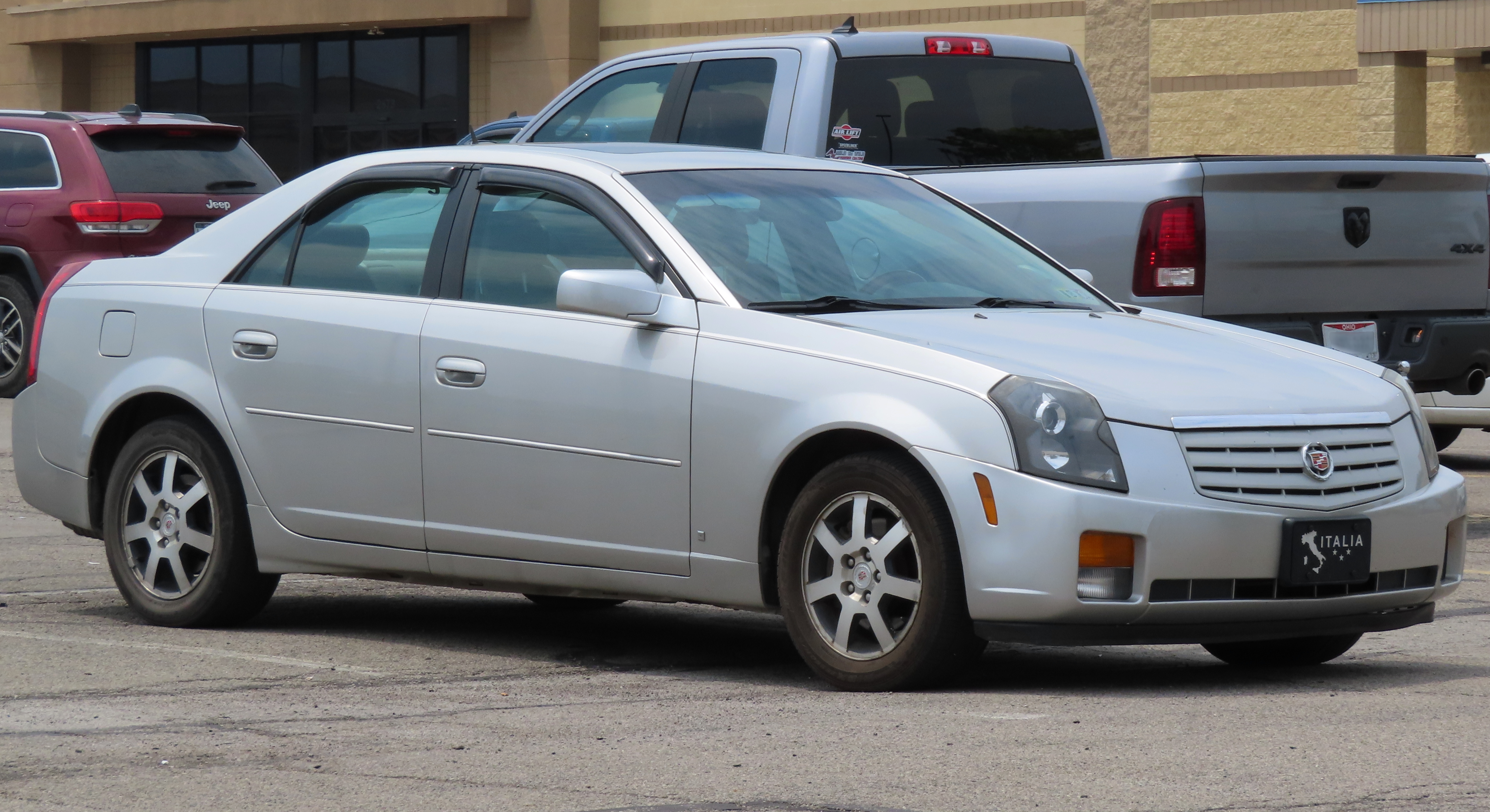

Overview
- Production: November 2001 – June 2007
- Model years: 2003–2007
- Assembly: United States: Lansing, Michigan (Lansing Grand River Assembly); China: Shanghai (Shanghai GM) Taiwan: Miaoli; Russia: Kaliningrad (Avtotor)
- Designer: Wayne Cherry (1998); Kip Wasenko (1998)

Body and chassis
- Body style: 4-door sedan
- Layout: Front-engine, rear-wheel drive
- Platform: GM Sigma platform/GMX320

Powertrain
- Engine: Gasoline: 2.6 L LY9 V6; 2.8 L LP1 V6; 3.2 L LA3 V6; 3.6 L LY7 V6; 5.7 L LS6 V8; 6.0 L LS2 V8
- Transmission: 5-speed 5L40-E automatic; 5-speed Getrag 260 manual; 6-speed Aisin AY-6 manual; 6-speed Tremec T-56 manual

Dimensions
- Wheelbase: 113.4 in (2,880 mm)
- Length: 190.1 in (4,829 mm)
- Width: 70.6 in (1,793 mm)
- Height: 56.7 in (1,440 mm)
- Curb weight: 3,568 lb (1,618 kg)

First manufactured on November 12, 2001, going on sale in January 2002 as a 2003 model, the CTS sedan used GM's new rear-wheel drive Sigma platform and a fully independent suspension. It was the first Cadillac offered with a manual transmission since the 1988 Cimarron. All models were manufactured at GM's Lansing Grand River Assembly in Lansing, Michigan.

The CTS replaced the Opel-based Catera, the initialism "CTS" standing for "Catera Touring Sedan". Wayne Cherry and Kip Wasenko designed the exterior of the first-generation CTS — the coupe variant having developed from a sketch drawn by Robert Munson, selected by Michael Simcoe, and developed into a model by Paul Sciluna.

The coupe marked the production debut of Cadillac's "Art and Science" design language, first seen on the Evoq concept, which automotive journalist Dan Neil described as a "fractal geometric style". Writing for The New York Times, Neil described the design of the CTS as "confident, distinctive and pure," and called the car itself "a serious automobile, a car of consequence. In its 100th year and at the 11th hour, Cadillac made a brave investment in the supremacy of design, in the idea that cleverness should be cloaked in beauty."

Originally powered by a 3.2 L LA3 V6 producing 220 hp (164 kW), the CTS received an updated 3.6 L DOHC V6 with variable valve timing as an option in 2004, producing 255 hp (190 kW) and 252 lb⋅ft (342 N⋅m) of torque. The 3.2 L engine went out of production in 2005, when a new 2.8 L version of the DOHC V6 debuted in an entry-level version of the CTS. In Europe, the 2.8 L replaced the previous entry-level 2.6 L engine.

The CTS was originally offered with either GM's in-house five-speed 5L40-E automatic transmission or a five-speed Getrag 260 manual transmission. For the 2005 model year, the Getrag was replaced with an Aisin AY-6 six-speed.

In 2004, GM introduced the CTS-V, a high-performance version of the CTS intended to compete with luxury performance sedans like the BMW M3/M5, Audi S4/S6, and Mercedes-Benz C- and E-Class AMGs. The 2004 and 2005 CTS-Vs were equipped with the 5.7L LS6 V-8 (400 hp (298 kW) at 6,000 rpm, 395 lb⋅ft (536 N⋅m) at 4,800 rpm), a Tremec T56 6-speed manual transmission, 14+" rotors and Brembo 4-piston calipers front and rear, suspension upgrades (higher spring rates, stiffer anti-roll bars, six-lug hubs, and two available damper packages), and subtle exterior changes. As the LS6 was phased out, the 2006 and 2007 CTS-Vs received the 6.0L LS2 V-8, which carried the same HP and torque ratings (with peak torque coming 400 rpm sooner).

A prototype first-generation CTS station wagon was created but never manufactured.

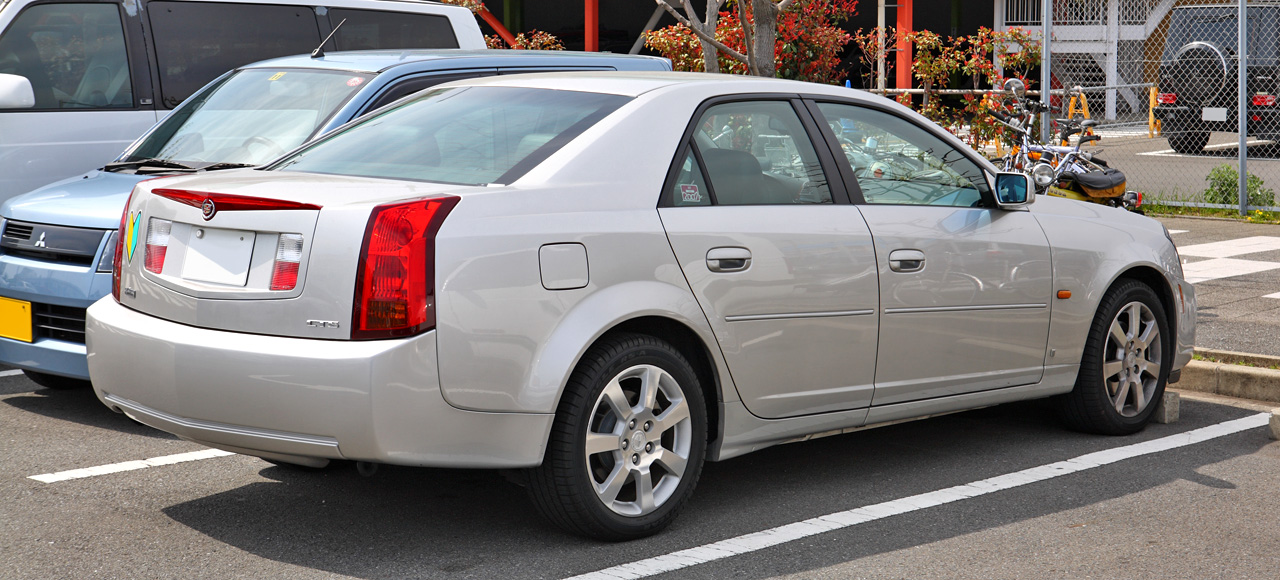
Japanese-spec CTS

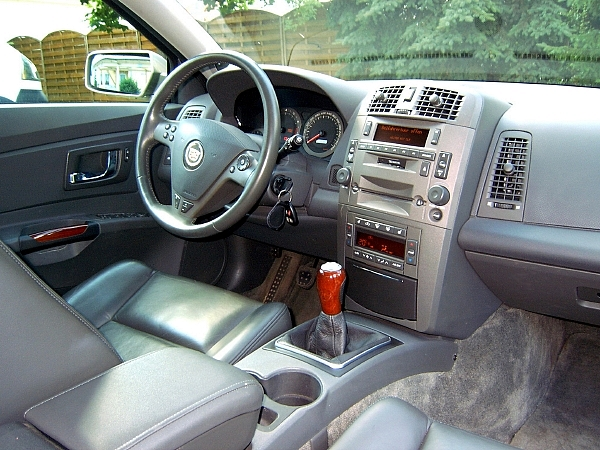
Interior

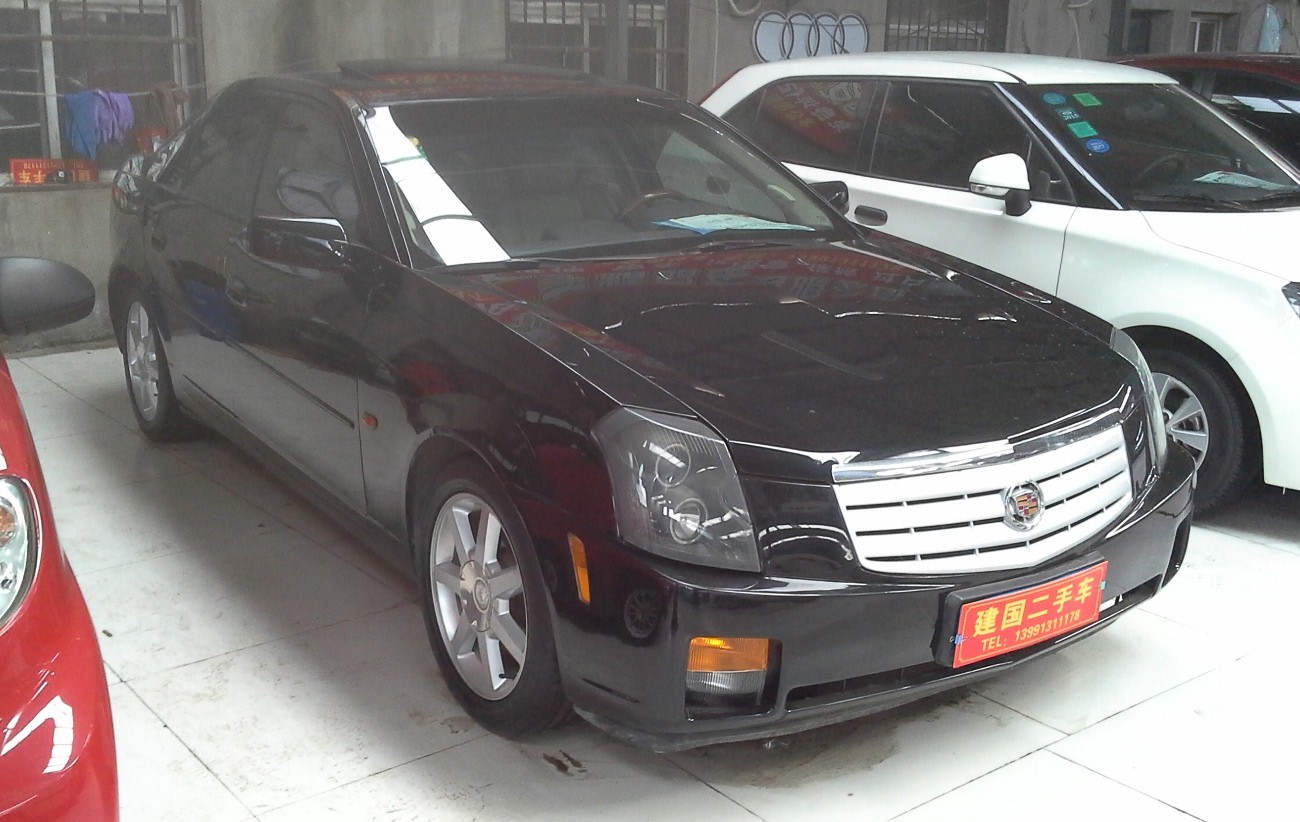
Chinese-built CTS

=== CTS-V (2004–2007) ===
==== Chassis ====
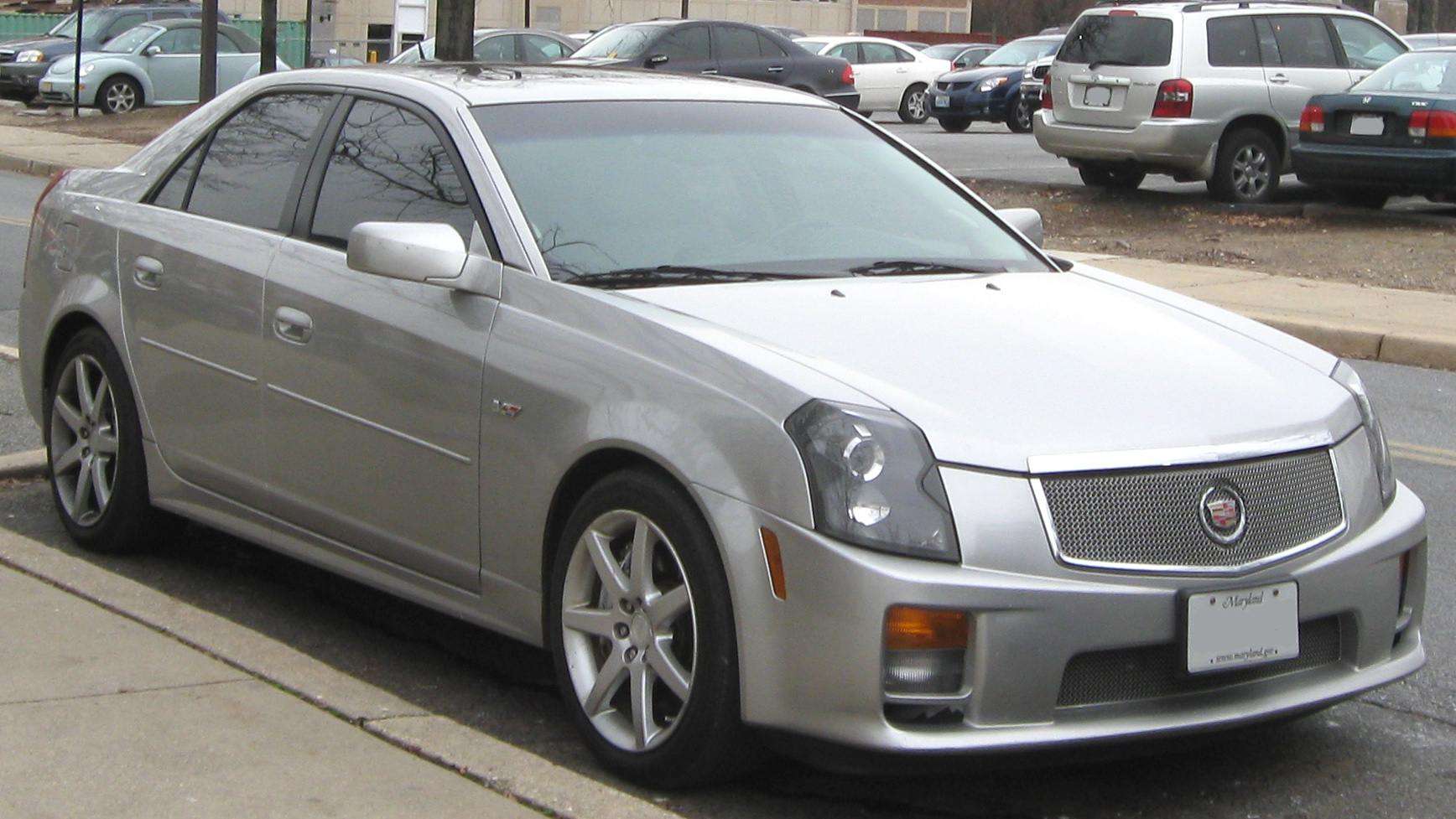
First generation Cadillac CTS-V

The first-generation CTS-V is based on the same rear-wheel-drive GM Sigma platform, as is the base model CTS. The use of a V8 engine required a unique engine cradle distinct from the base CTS V6. Larger anti-roll bars and larger shocks were also added. The spring rate was significantly increased. The 2006–2007 update also included a stronger rear differential and half shaft design. Unique front and rear treatments also included mesh grilles over the front openings, a track-ready suspension, six-lug hubs instead of the regular CTS's five-lug units, and 18×8.5 inch wheels inside of P245/45R18 Z-rated Goodyear Eagle F1 Supercar run-flat tires. Brakes were 13.97 in (355 mm) rotors in the front, with 14.37 in (365 mm) rotors in the rear - each with four-piston Brembo calipers on the front and rear wheels. In addition, GM badges were added on 2006 models. For performance enthusiasts, a high-performance suspension package (RPO FG2) was available as a dealer-installed option.

==== Engine ====
The CTS sedan is enhanced with GM performance parts like a 5.7 L LS6 V8, as well as the Chevrolet Corvette Z06's six-speed Tremec manual transmission gear ratios. From 2004 and 2005, the CTS-V came with the 5.7 L pushrod OHV LS6 engine producing 400 hp (298 kW) at 6,000 rpm and 395 lb⋅ft (536 N⋅m) of torque at 4,800 rpm. The 5 lb⋅ft (7 N⋅m) torque reduction of the CTS-V vs the LS6 used in the C5 Z06, was due to the exhaust manifold that needed to be used on the CTS-V. From 2006 to 2007, the previous LS6 engine was superseded by the 6.0 L OHV LS2. The new LS2 engine was rated at the same 400 hp (298 kW) at 6,000 rpm with the peak torque of 395 lb⋅ft (536 N⋅m) at 4,400 rpm. While both engines offer the same HP and torque specifications, the LS2's benefit was a wider torque band, due to the higher displacement it offered.

==== Transmission ====
The only available transmission was the six-speed manual Tremec T56. The transmission used the skip-shift feature to conserve fuel during light loads by preventing drivers from using the second and third gears, and a dual mass flywheel to reduce "rattle" in no load conditions. The rear axle was a Getrag limited-slip IRS unit with a 3.73:1 ratio.

==== Performance ====
General Motors states a 0–60 mph (97 km/h) time of 4.6 seconds for the first-generation CTS-V, with the quarter mile time estimated at 13.1 seconds at 109 mph (175 km/h), onward to a stated top speed of 163 mph (262 km/h). The 14-inch Brembo brakes can slow the vehicle from 60 mph (97 km/h) in 110 feet. The first-generation CTS-V also posted a lap time of 8 minutes and 19 seconds at Nürburgring Nordschleife, competitive with rivals such as the Mercedes-Benz E55 AMG and BMW M5.

== Second generation (2008) ==
Second generation
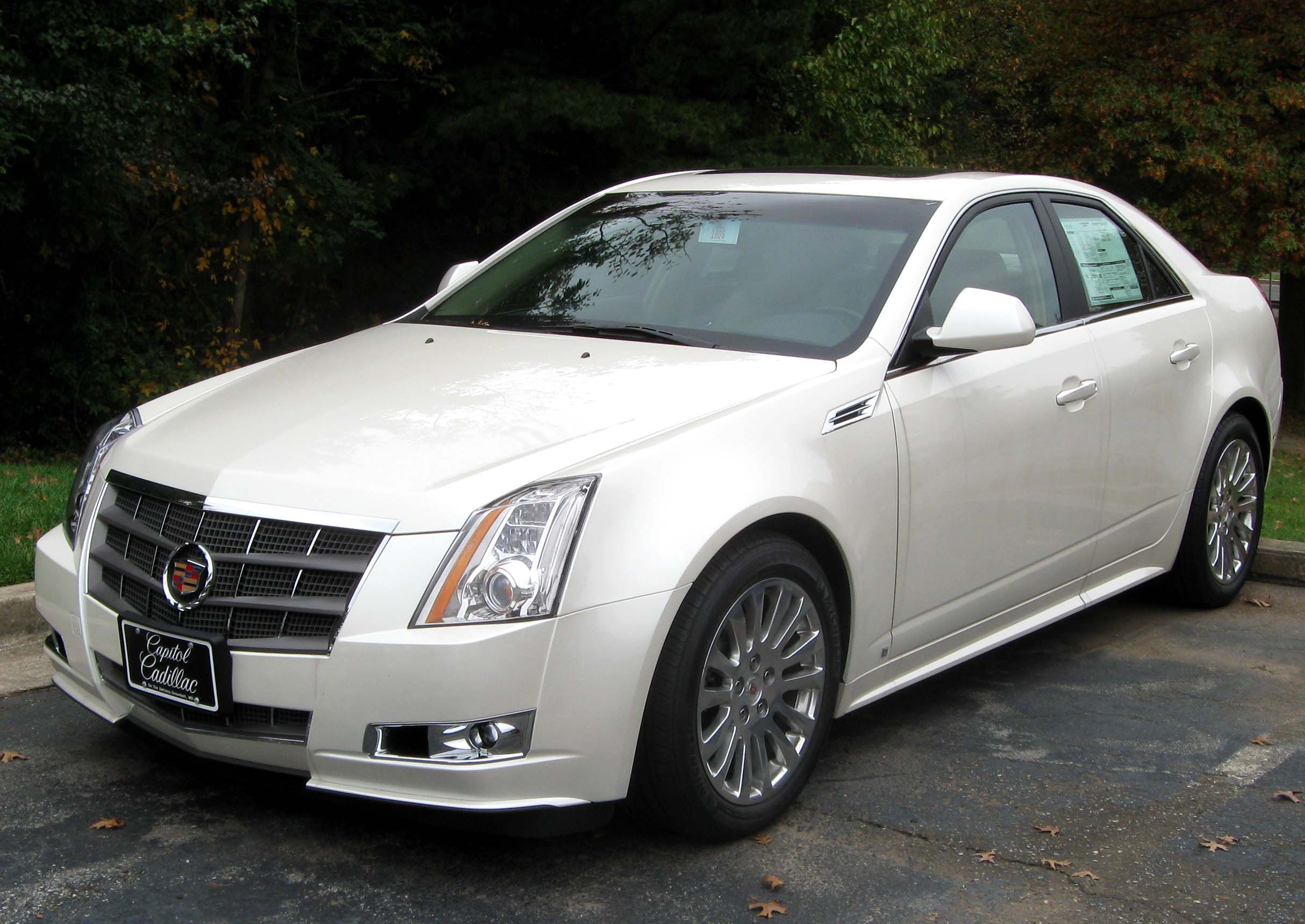

Overview
- Production: 2007–2014
- Model years: 2008–2013 (sedan, 2014 for V only); 2010–2014 (wagon); 2011–2014 (coupe, 2015 for V only)
- Assembly: United States: Lansing, Michigan (Lansing Grand River Assembly); Russia: Kaliningrad (Avtotor)
- Designer: Robert Munson (coupe concept); John Manoogian II (2004); Eric Clough (interiors, 2004)

Body and chassis
- Body style: 2-door coupé (2011–2014); 4-door sedan (2008–2013); 5-door station wagon (2010–2014)
- Layout: Front-engine, rear-wheel drive; Front-engine, four-wheel drive
- Platform: GM Sigma II; GMX322 (sedan); GMX206 (wagon); GMX226 (coupe)

Powertrain
- Engine: Gasoline: 2.8 L LP1 V6; 3.0 L LF1 V6; 3.0 L LFW V6; 3.6 L LY7 V6; 3.6 L LLT V6; 3.6 L LFX V6; 6.2 L LSA supercharged V8
- Transmission: 6-speed 6L50 automatic; 6-speed 6L90 automatic (CTS-V); 6-speed Aisin AY-6 manual; 6-speed Tremec 6L95M manual

Dimensions
- Wheelbase: 113.4 in (2,880 mm)
- Length: 191.3 in (4,859 mm) (sedan); 192 in (4,877 mm) (wagon); 189.3 in (4,808 mm) (coupe)
- Width: 72.5 in (1,841 mm) (sedan); 72.5 in (1,841 mm) (wagon); 74.1 in (1,882 mm) (coupe)
- Height: 58 in (1,473 mm) (sedan); 58 in (1,473 mm) (wagon); 56 in (1,422 mm) (coupe)
- Curb weight: 3,860 lb (1,751 kg) (sedan)

GM presented the 2008 CTS at the North American International Auto Show in January 2007. The 2008–2009 base model featured a 3.6 L LY7 V6 with 263 hp (196 kW) and 253 lb⋅ft (343 N⋅m) of torque carried over from the previous generation. A second engine, a new 3.6 L direct-injection V6 VVT engine with 304 hp (227 kW) and 273 lb⋅ft (370 N⋅m) of torque was also offered. For 2010, the base engine changed to a 3.0L variable valve timing (VVT) V6 with 270 hp (201 kW) and 224 lb⋅ft (304 N⋅m) of torque. GM's 6-speed Hydra-matic 6L50 automatic transmission was standard on all variants, a 6-speed manual transmission was available as an option on the second generation CTS. On-demand all-wheel drive was offered with both engines when equipped with an automatic transmission. Suspension, braking, and steering improvements from the previous generation CTS-V were incorporated into the new standard CTS.

The second-generation CTS was wider and longer than the original, measuring 191.6 in (4,867 mm) long, 72.5 in (1,841 mm) wide and 58 in (1,473 mm) in height. Wheelbase remained unchanged at 113.4 in (2,880 mm), but with a wider front/rear track of 61.8 / 62.0 in (1,570 / 1,575 mm). Other changes included revised exterior, grille, headlights and taillights, side air extractor vents located forward of the front doors, nine-spoke 18-inch wheels, and high-performance brake calipers and rotors. Available features on the second-gen CTS included a Bose 5.1 surround sound system, GM's ESC system (marketed as Stabiltrak), tire pressure monitoring system, navigation system with real-time traffic and weather data, integrated hard drive for music storage, swiveling headlights, and remote starting.

In 2008, General Motors anticipated relaunching the Cadillac brand in Australia and New Zealand with the second-generation CTS, but subsequently dropped the launch due to the 2008 financial crisis. As a result, the entire batch of cars, less one, which had already been shipped to Australia were transferred to New Zealand and sold via selected Holden New Zealand dealers. One dealer ended up buying the entire stock and, owing to their popularity, sourced further UK market spec models while the model was still produced in right hand drive.

Midway through the 2010 model year, the small GM badges, used by the corporation company-wide, were dropped.

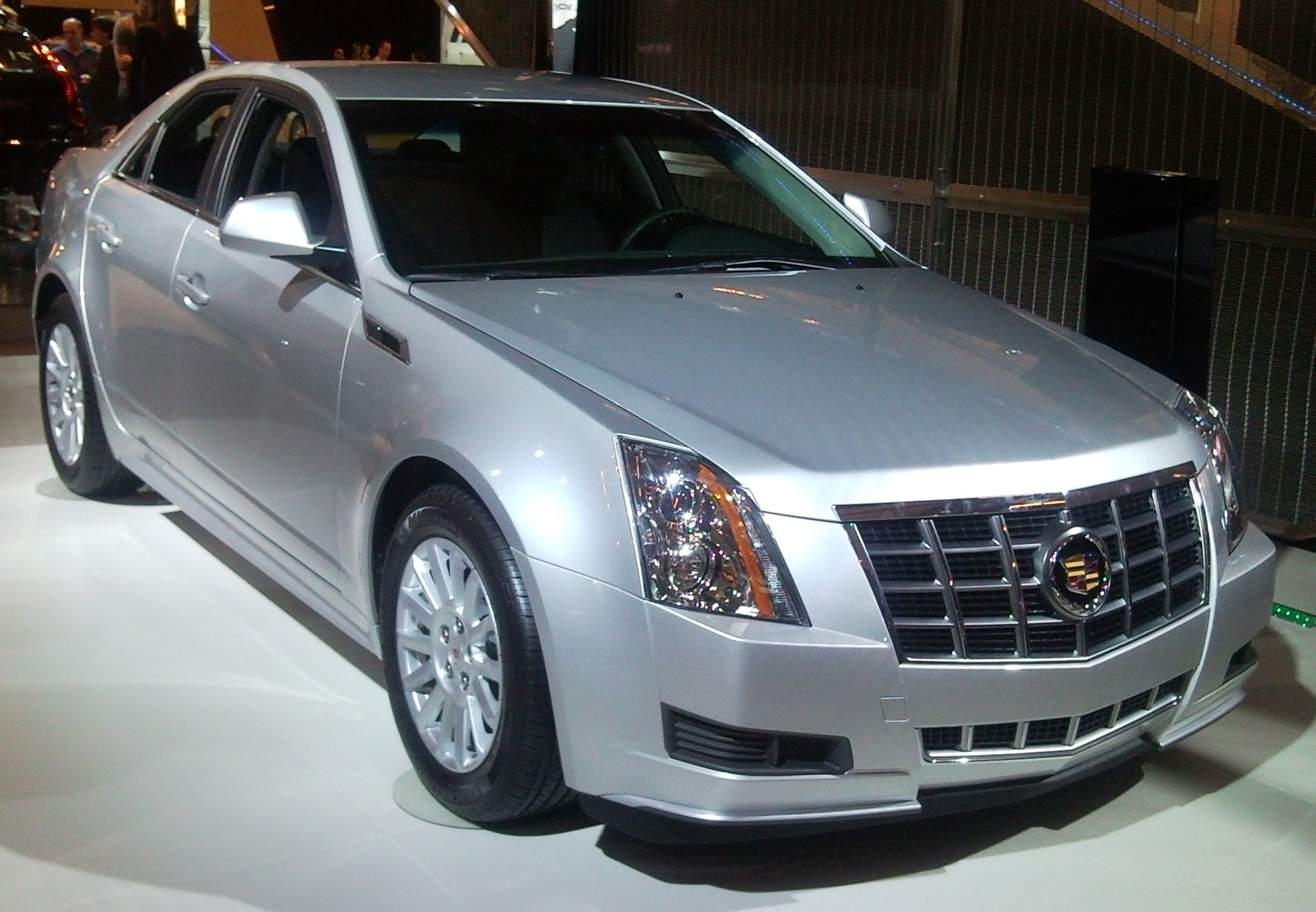
2012 Cadillac CTS sedan

For the 2012 CTS, the front grille used higher quality materials to give a more vertical design, and the Cadillac logo revised. Power was increased on the 3.6-liter V6 to produce 323 hp (241 kW), while modified engine internals reduced weight. For 2012, GM also offered some new technology and option packages with the CTS.

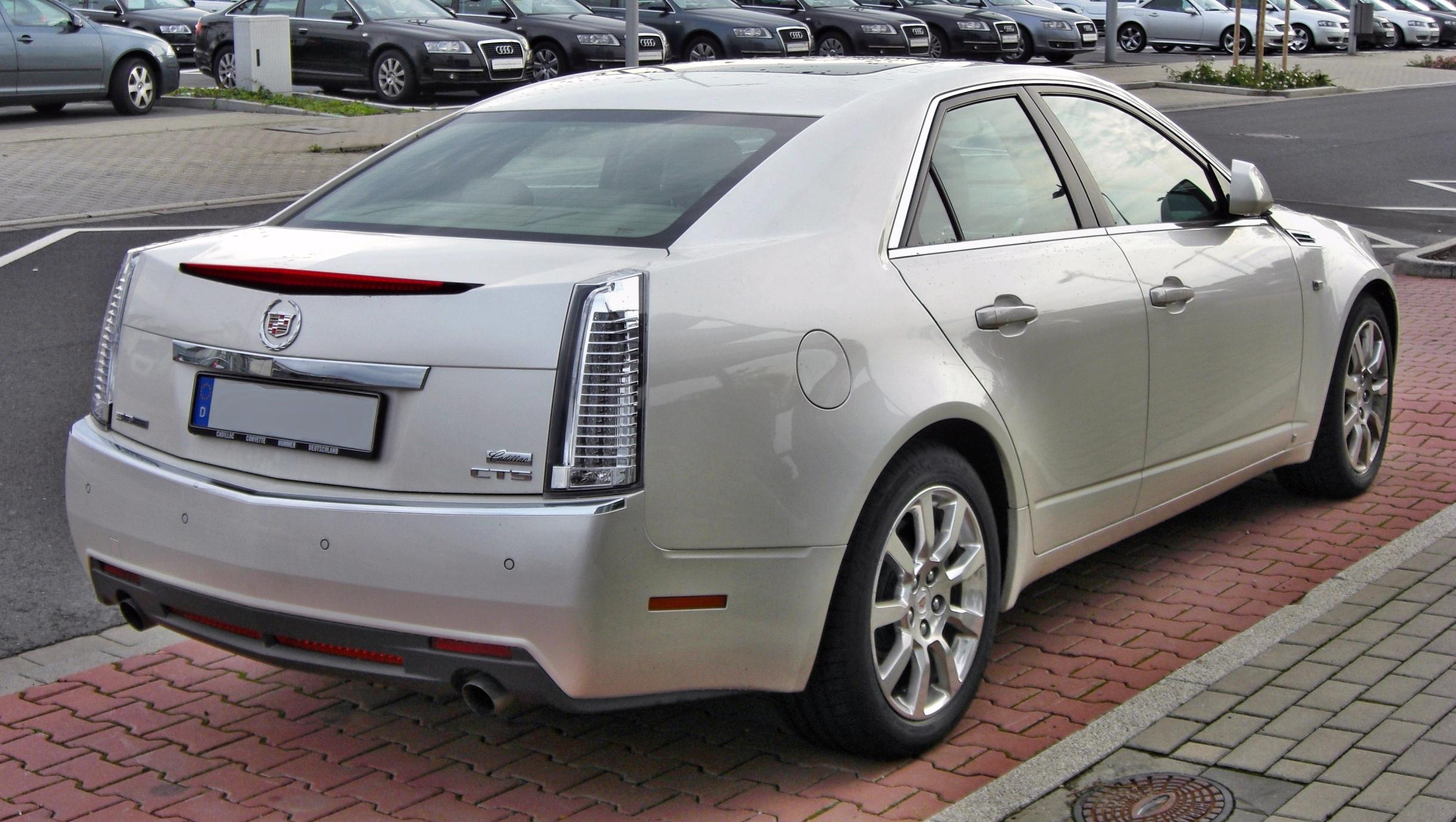
European-spec Cadillac CTS

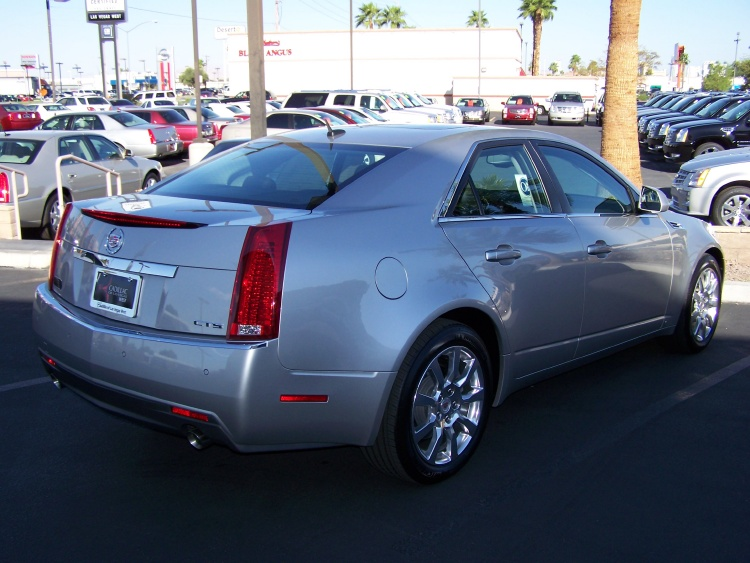
US–spec Cadillac CTS

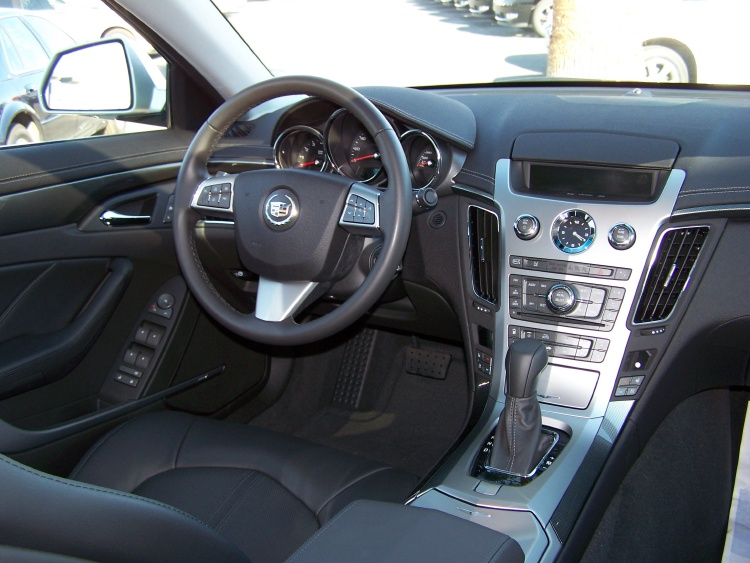
CTS interior

=== Coupe ===
General Motors unveiled a coupe concept version of the CTS, along with the new CTS-V performance sedan, at the 2008 North American International Auto Show in Detroit.

In November 2009, the production version was presented in a press release. The coupe went into production in spring 2010 for sale in August of that year as a 2011 model. The design of the production model is very similar to the concept, still without a B-pillar. The standard engine was a 3.6L direct injected V6 rated at 304 hp. Like the sedan, both six-speed manual and automatic transmissions, in either rear-wheel drive or all-wheel drive configurations, were available. A CTS-V Coupe was also introduced at the 2010 North American International Auto Show in Detroit. It was Cadillac's first coupe since the Eldorado, which was discontinued in 2002.

Along with the CTS sedan, the coupe received a slight facelift for the 2012 model year, including a new grille design. The CTS Coupe was discontinued after the 2014 model year, while the CTS-V Coupe remained in production for the 2015 model year.

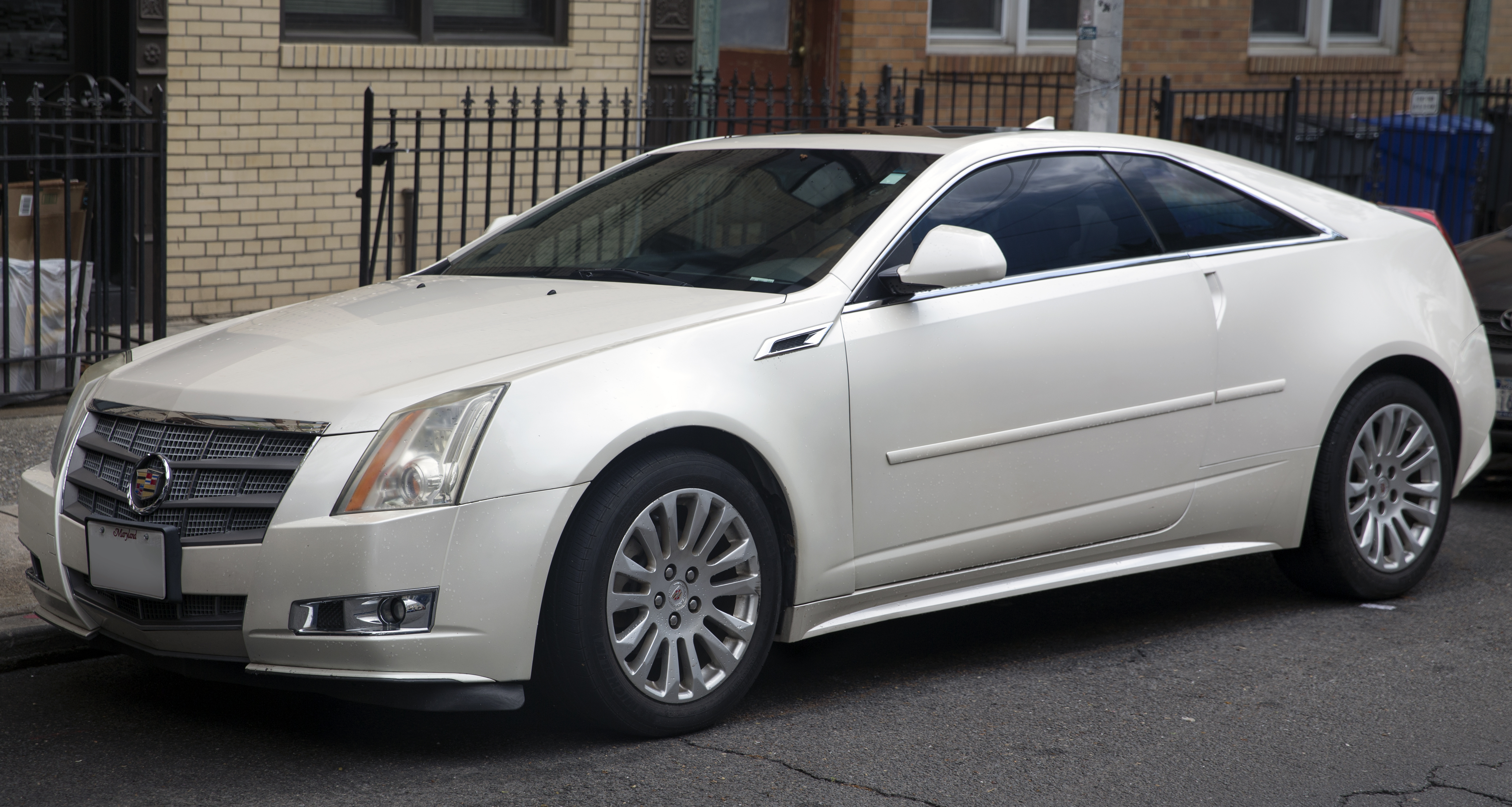
2011 Cadillac CTS coupe (launch model)

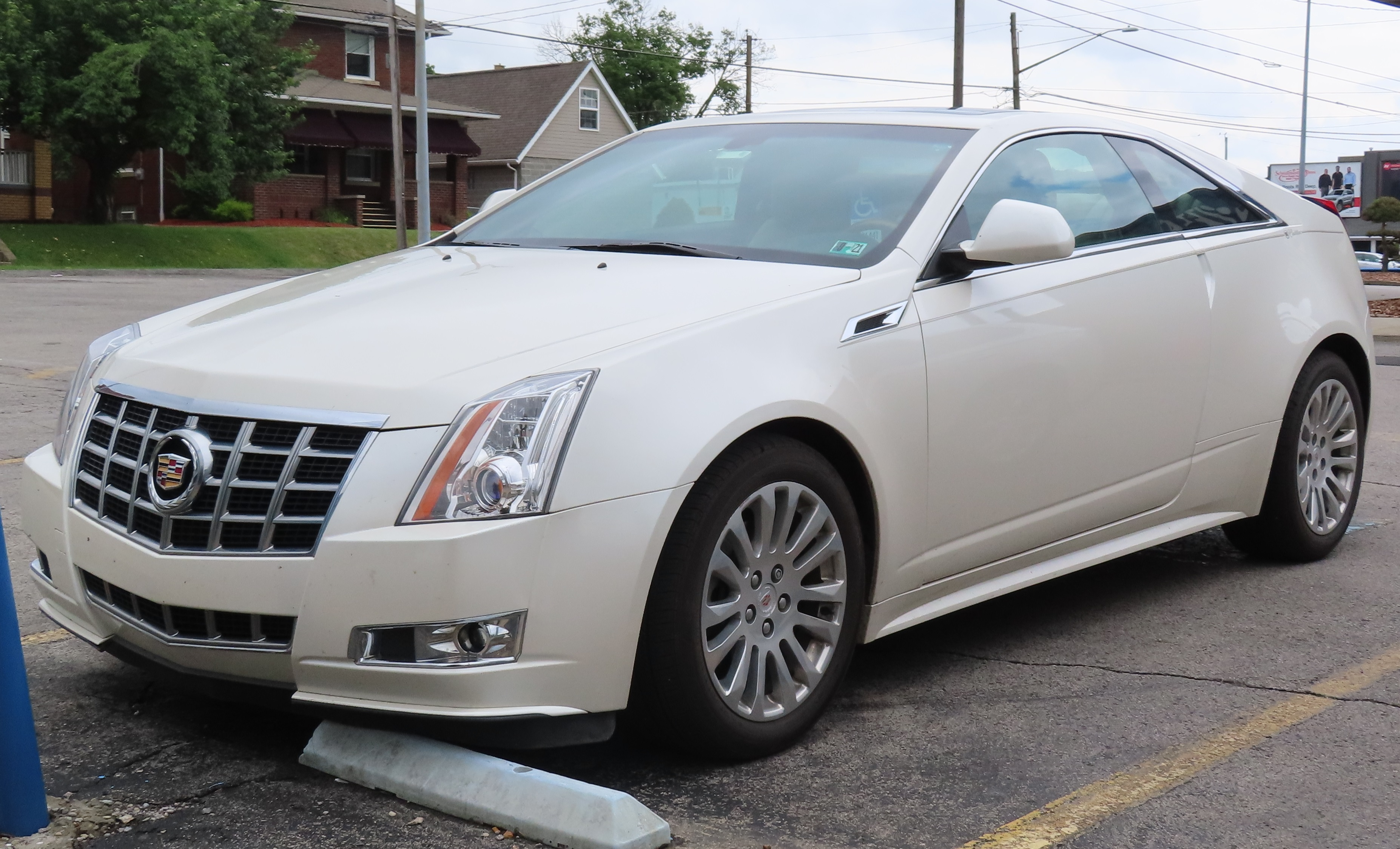
Cadillac CTS coupe, facelift version

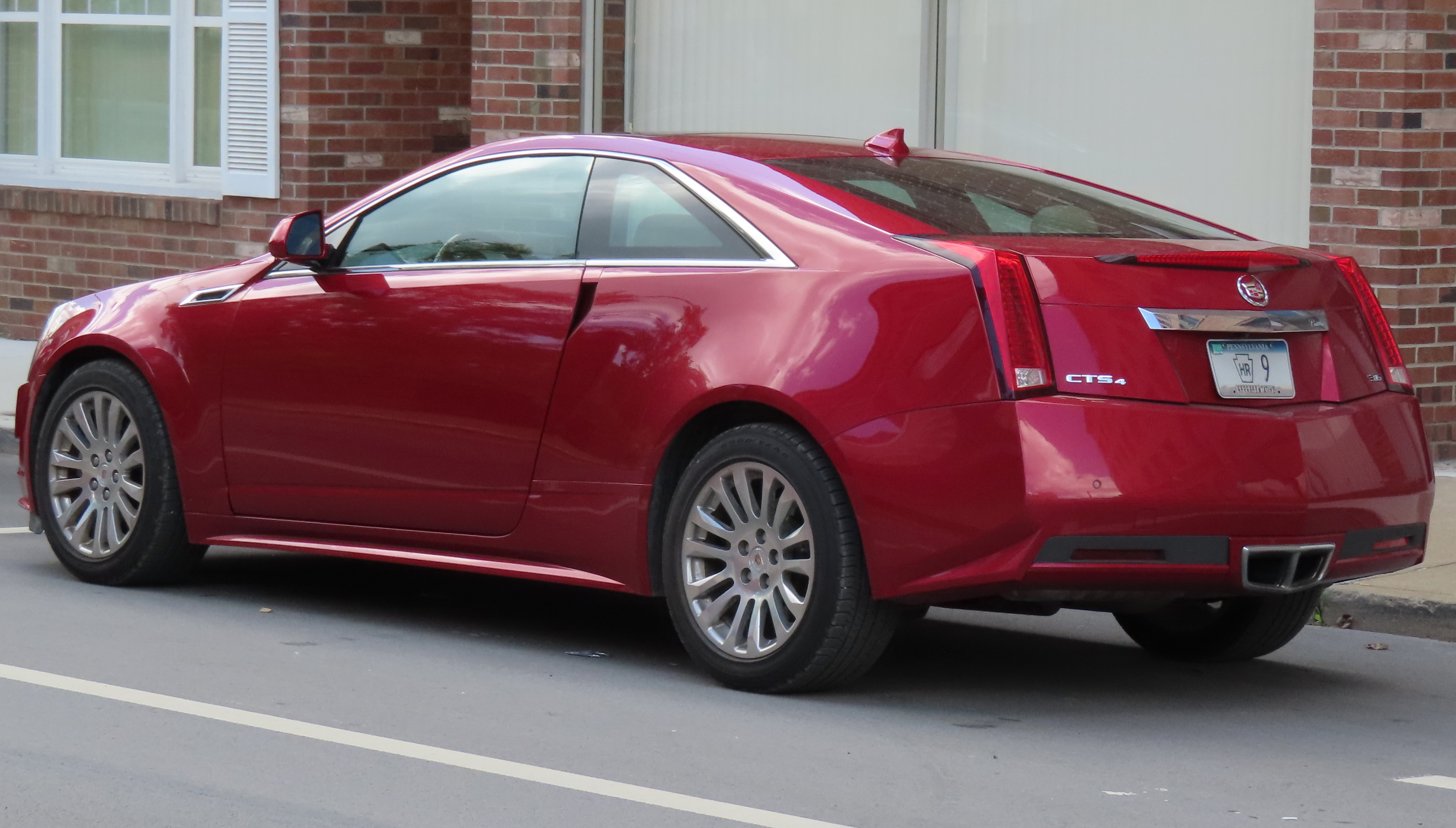
2012 Cadillac CTS coupe (facelift)

=== Sport Wagon ===
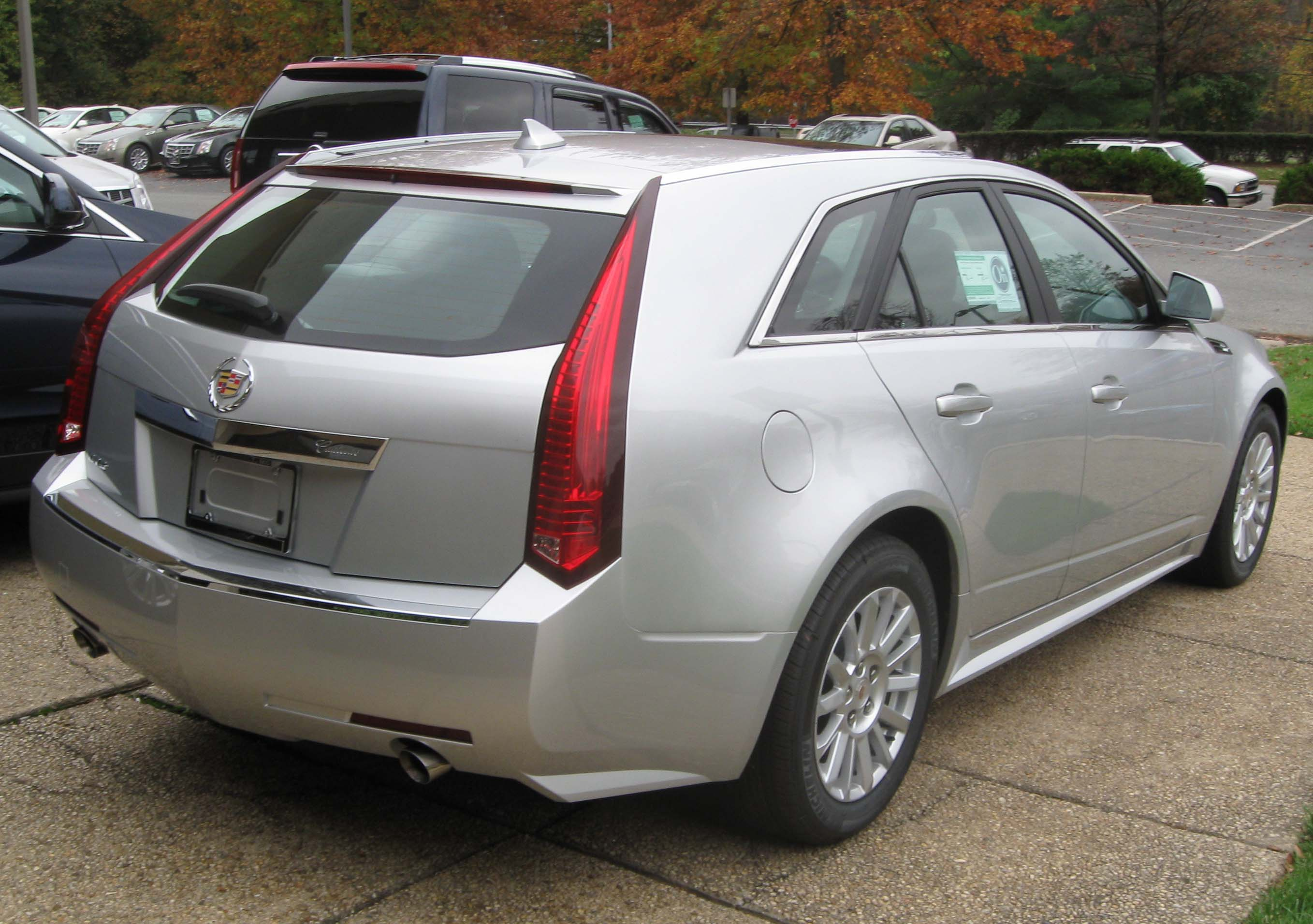
2010 Cadillac CTS wagon

Cadillac introduced the 2010 CTS Sport Wagon at the 2008 Pebble Beach Concours d'Elegance. The wagon became available in late 2009 as a 2010 model. A CTS-V version was added for 2011.

The CTS Sport Wagon is available in either rear-wheel drive or all-wheel drive layouts, and is powered by either a 3.0-liter DOHC V6 engine or a 3.6-liter V6 with variable valve timing. The 3.0-liter engine produces 270 hp (201 kW), and the 3.6-liter produces 304 hp (227 kW).

With the third generation, Cadillac ceased production of the CTS wagon.

=== CTS-V (2009–2014) ===
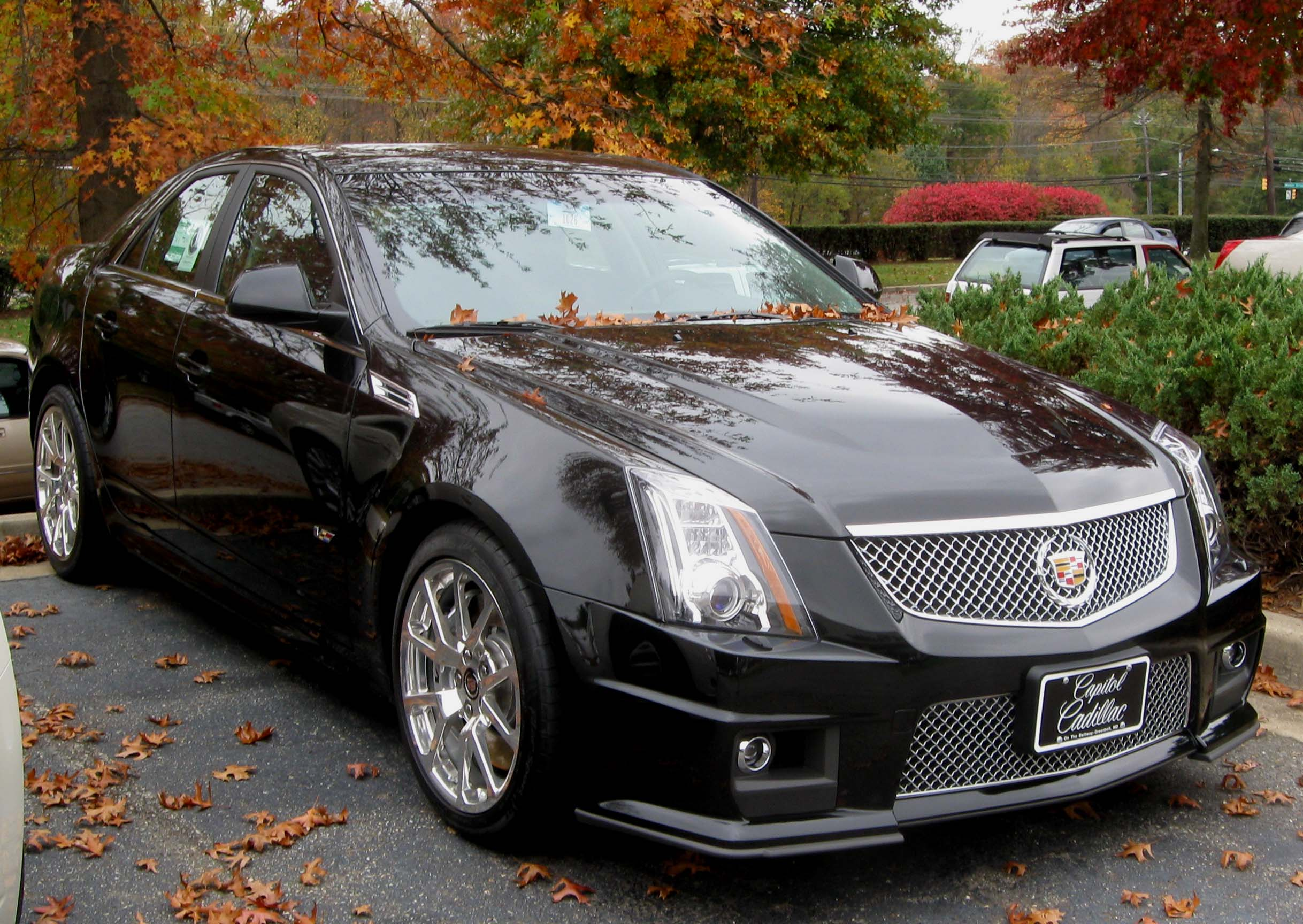
Cadillac CTS-V (second generation)

The second-generation CTS-V is based on the new GM Sigma II platform. The rear-wheel drive platform is the basis for the 2008 to present Cadillac CTS base model with which the CTS-V shares most of the body work. The suspension features coil springs front and rear. The front suspension is a control arm arrangement while the rear is an independent multi-link suspension. To improve the handling and comfort, the 2009 CTS-V uses BWI Group's MagneRide technology. The dampers, filled with magnetorheological fluid, are adjusted based on sensor readings that occur at 1 ms intervals. The sedan has four-wheel disc brakes similar to the first generation. The front brakes were increased in size to 14.567 in (370.0 mm) ventilated discs with six-piston Brembo fixed calipers. The rear brakes are 14.37 in (365 mm) ventilated rotors with four-piston calipers. Steering is speed-sensing hydraulic-assist rack-and-pinion. The steering ratio is 16.1:1. Tire sizes are 255/40ZR19 front and 285/35ZR19 rear on 19×9.0 inch and 19×9.5 inch wheels front and rear.

The second-generation CTS-V sedan, coupe, and station wagon were marketed through 2014, concurrent with the third-generation standard sedan, until the third-generation CTS-V was ready. The car was discontinued and replaced by the CT5–V Blackwing in 2019.

==== Engine ====
The powerplant in the 2009 CTS-V is a supercharged 6,162 cc (6.2 L; 376.0 cu in) LSA V-8, based on the LS9 V8, producing 556 hp (415 kW) and 551 lb⋅ft (747 N⋅m) of torque. The choice to use a pushrod engine (OHV) arrangement is unique in the luxury performance sedan market where competitors typically use dual overhead camshaft (DOHC) engines. The engine is produced in GM's Silao, Guanajuato, Mexico engine assembly plant. The LSA engine has a bore x stroke of 4.065 in × 3.622 in (103.25 mm × 92 mm). The engine block is cast aluminium 319-T5 alloy with cast iron cylinder liners. The crankshaft is forged steel using powdered-metal connecting rods. Pistons are high-silicon Hypereutectic Aluminium alloy replacing the forged aluminum used in the LS9 engine. The compression ratio is 9.1:1. The cylinder heads are based on the Corvette's LS3 head and are cast from type 356-T6 Aluminum alloy. The exhaust manifolds are cast iron. The supercharger is a twin four-lobe screw compressor-type unit displacing 1.9 L (116 cu in). It is Eaton's Twin Vortices Series (TVS) generating a maximum boost of 9.0 psi (62.1 kPa). Intake air is cooled with a water-to-air intercooler built directly into the supercharger unit.

==== Transmissions ====
There are manual and automatic transmission choices. The manual is a Tremec TR-6060 six-speed transmission with a short-throw shifter, twin-disk clutch and dual-mass flywheel. The 6L90 automatic is a paddle shift conventional (planetary gearing and torque converter-based) automatic six-speed.

==== CTS-V sedan ====
Production of the CTS-V sedan began in the summer of 2008 at GM's Lansing Grand River Assembly plant in Lansing, Michigan. Total production of the CTS-V for the 2009 model year was approximately 3,500 out of approximately 59,716 CTS model production. The 2009 CTS-V had a base price of US$59,995, and was available for purchase on November 1, 2008.

Standard features include leather seats, lateral acceleration gauge, 19-inch aluminum alloy wheels, Michelin Pilot Sport PS2 tires, a built-in 40GB hard drive to store music, and LED flash tracers to tell the driver when to shift. Options include polished wheels, sunroof, navigation system and, for the first time, 14-way adjustable performance Recaro seats.

The official 0-60 mph (97 km/h) time for the second-generation CTS-V is 3.9 seconds, while the quarter mile is run at 12.0 seconds at 118 mph (190 km/h). These numbers were duplicated by Road & Track magazine (0-60 mph in 3.9 seconds for the automatic and 4.1 seconds for the manual).

Coinciding with the release of General Motors' Viability Plan, the automaker disbanded its High Performance Vehicle Operations team, the crew responsible for the V series Cadillacs, the Chevrolet Cobalt SS, the HHR SS, and the V8 version of the Colorado. According to GM spokesman Vince Muniga, "All high-performance projects are on indefinite hold. The engineers are moving into different areas of the organization, and they will work on Cadillacs, Buicks, Chevrolets and Pontiacs." Muniga went on to say that there were no plans for high-performance versions of upcoming plans, but the team could be reinstated once GM was in a better financial position.

For the 2010 model year, GM badges were dropped from near the doors, although earlier models still had the badges.

==== CTS-V Coupe ====
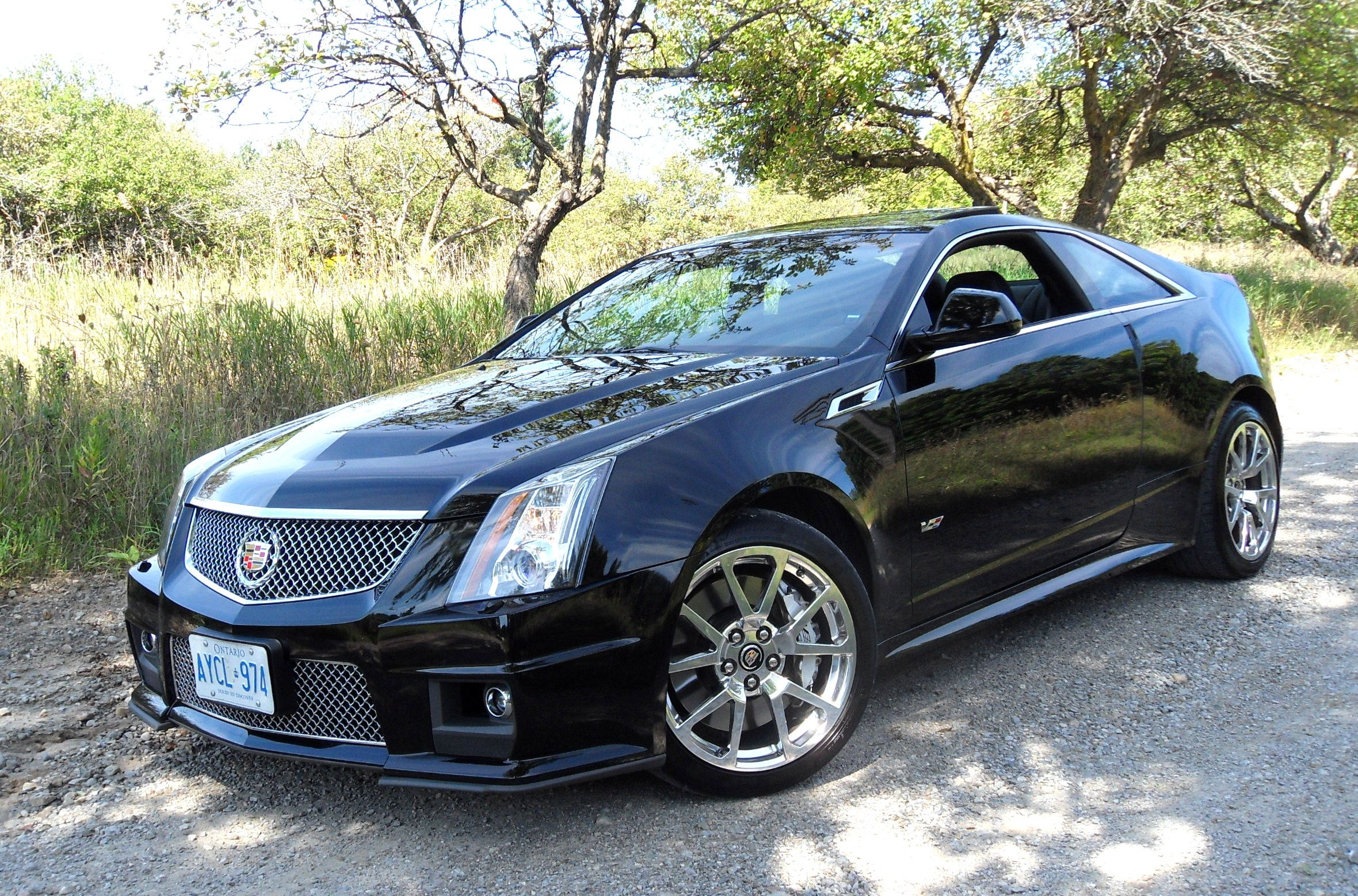
Cadillac CTS-V coupe

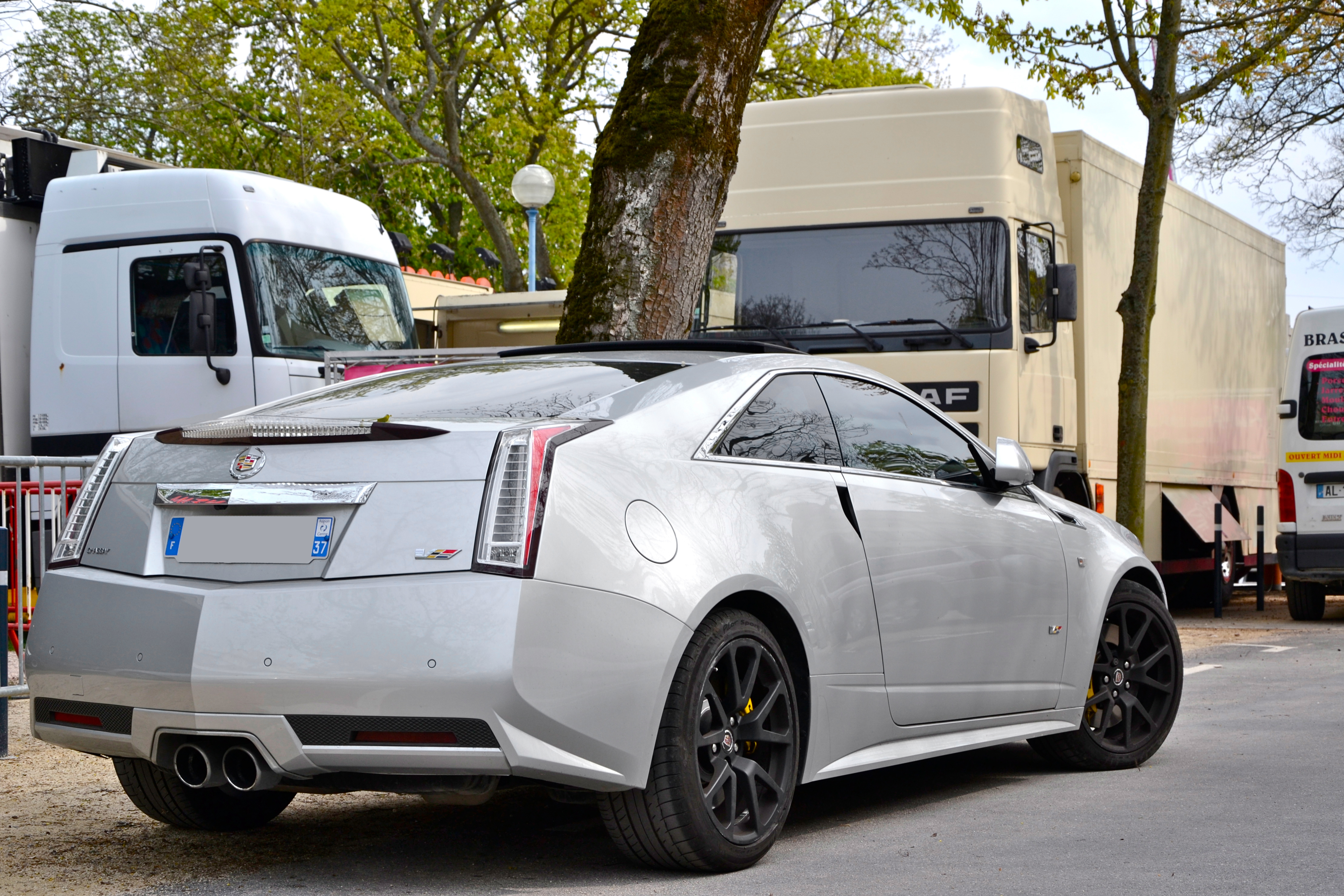
Cadillac CTS-V coupe

The CTS-V Coupe debuted at the 2010 North American International Auto Show in Detroit, and entered production in summer 2010 as a 2011 model. It has the same 556 hp (415 kW) engine and transmission choices as the CTS-V sedan. The CTS-V Coupe features unique centered twin exhausts, a larger grille for air intake, and an optional "saffron" interior trim color. Like the CTS-V sedan, it comes standard with 19-inch aluminum wheels, Brembo brakes, and Magnetic Ride Control.

==== CTS-V Sport Wagon ====
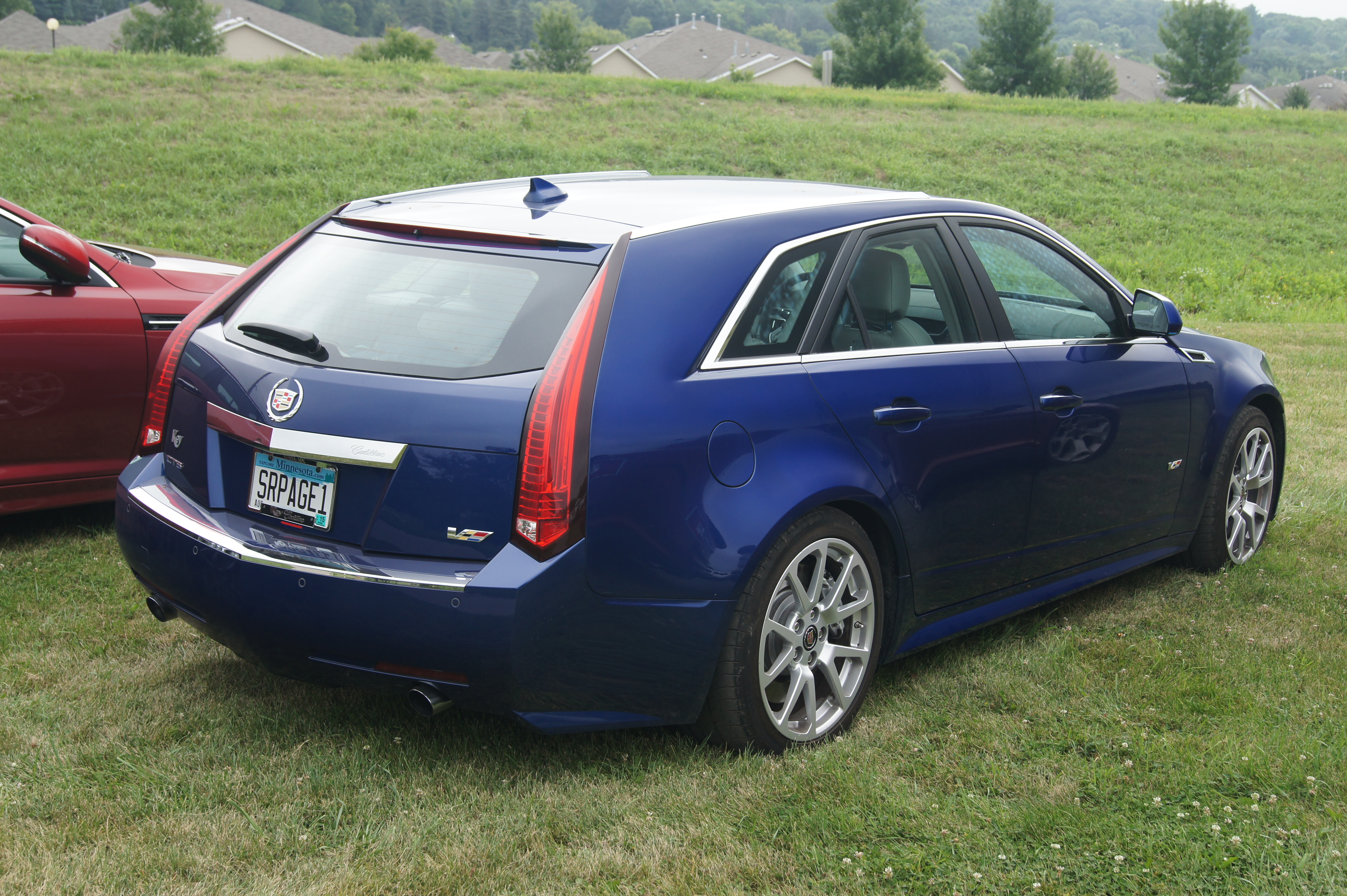
Cadillac CTS-V Sport Wagon

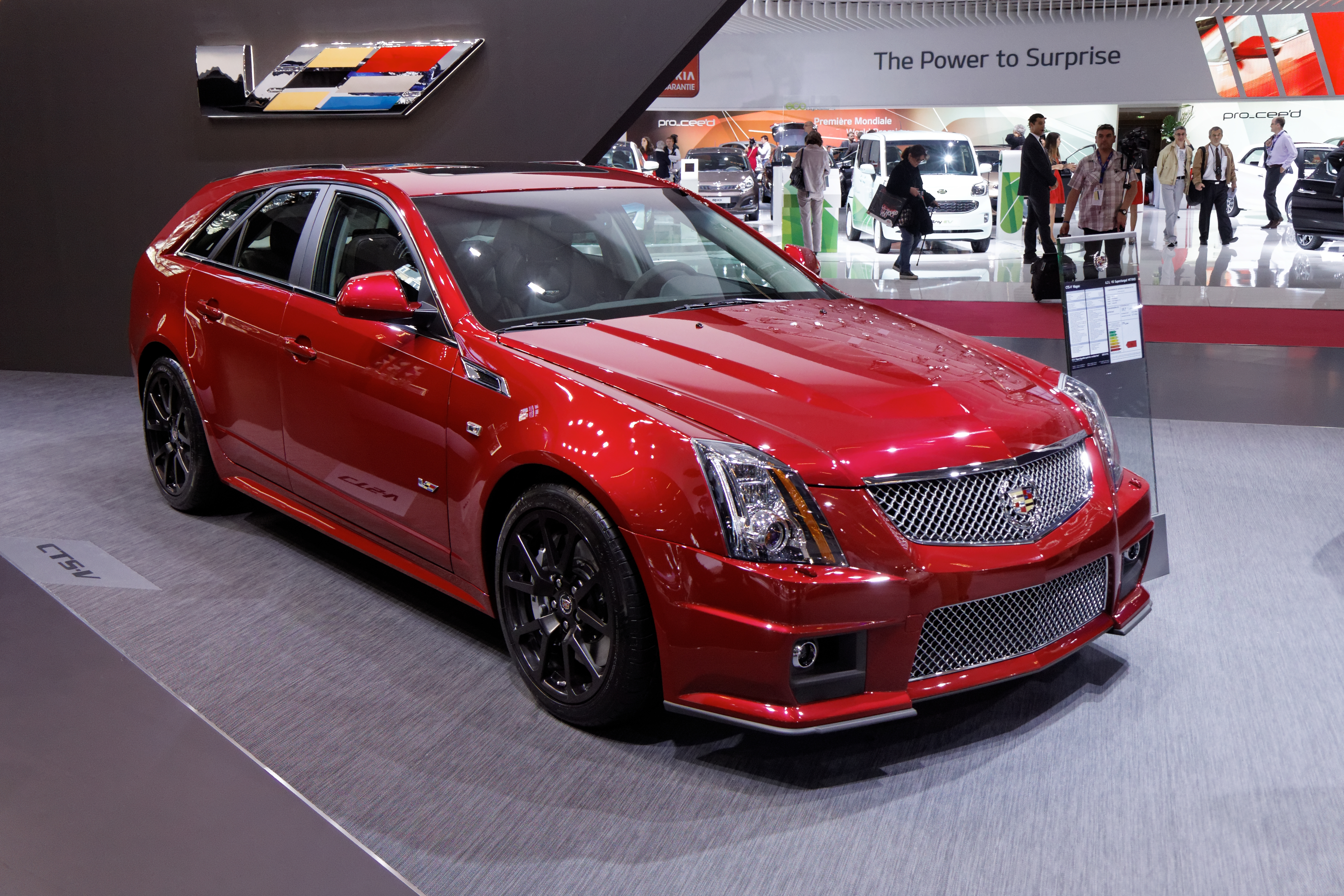
Cadillac CTS-V Wagon at the 2012 Paris Motor Show

In 2009, GM vice chairman Bob Lutz said about the possibility of a CTS-V wagon, "... should sufficient demand materialize, there is no reason why we couldn't do a V-Series wagon, and I would be standing in line for one, just ahead of you." GM decided to move forward, introducing a 5-door sport wagon body style to the CTS-V vehicle line at the New York International Auto Show on March 29, 2010.

The CTS-V wagon shares the 556 hp (415 kW) engine and 6-speed manual or automatic transmission, Magnetic Ride Control, Brembo brakes, 19-inch aluminum wheels and performance tires and a dual-airflow grille also used in the CTS-V sedan and coupe. The Environmental Protection Agency listed the 2014 CTS-V Sport Wagon as the least fuel efficient small station wagon on sale in the United States, with a combined EPA fuel economy rating of 14 mpg_{‑US} (17 L/100 km; 17 mpg_{‑imp}).

==== Performance ====
General Motors stated a 0-60 mph (97 km/h) time of 3.9 seconds for the CTS-V Sedan and 4.0 seconds for the CTS-V Coupe and Wagon. The quarter mile time was reported to be 11.97 seconds at 116.9 mph (188.1 km/h) with a 60-foot at 1.76 seconds.

In May 2008, a 2009-model CTS-V sedan achieved a lap time of 7:59.32 at the Nürburgring Nordschleife, the fastest documented time for a production sedan on factory tires until the Porsche Panamera Turbo clocked a time of 7:56 in July 2009. The vehicle was driven by John Heinricy during the attempt. The record-breaking vehicle was sold in 2009 at the Barrett-Jackson Palm Beach auction.

== Third generation (2014) ==
Third generation
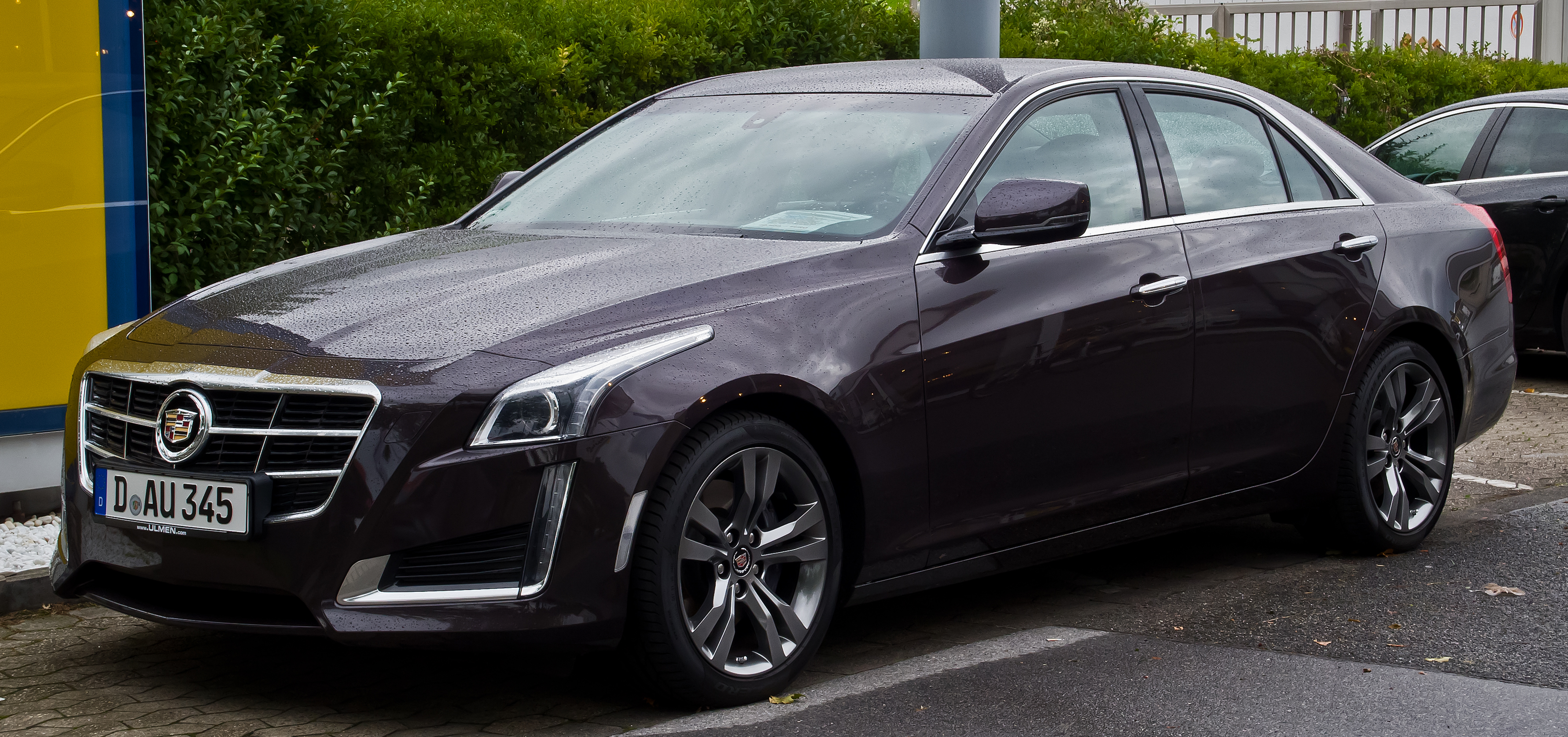

Overview
- Production: September 2013–July 2019
- Model years: 2014–2019
- Assembly: United States: Lansing, Michigan (Lansing Grand River Assembly)
- Designer: Exterior: Bob Boniface and Robin Krieg; Interior: Eric Clough

Body and chassis
- Body style: 4-door sedan
- Layout: Front-engine, rear-wheel drive; Front-engine, four-wheel drive
- Platform: GM Alpha

Powertrain
- Engine: Gasoline: 2.0 L LTG Ecotec turbocharged I4; 3.6 L LFX V6; 3.6 L LGX V6; 3.6 L LF3 twin-turbocharged V6; 6.2 L LT4 supercharged V8
- Transmission: 6-speed GM 6L45 automatic; 8-speed Aisin TL-80SN automatic; 8-speed GM 8L90 automatic

Dimensions
- Wheelbase: 114.6 in (2,911 mm)
- Length: 195.5 in (4,966 mm)
- Width: 72.2 in (1,834 mm)
- Height: 57.2 in (1,453 mm)
- Curb weight: 3,615–3,976 lb (1,640–1,803 kg)

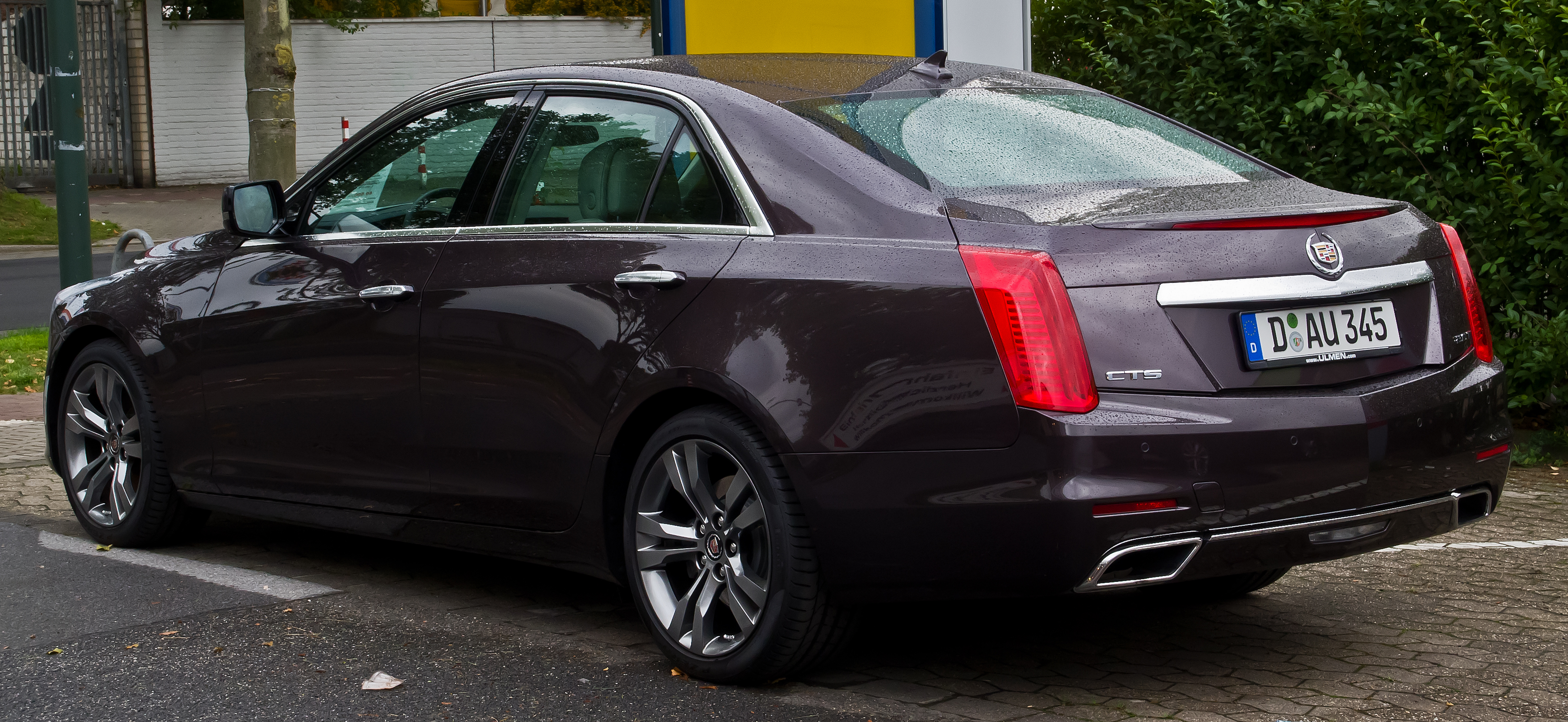
Cadillac CTS 2.0 Turbo Luxury sedan (Germany)

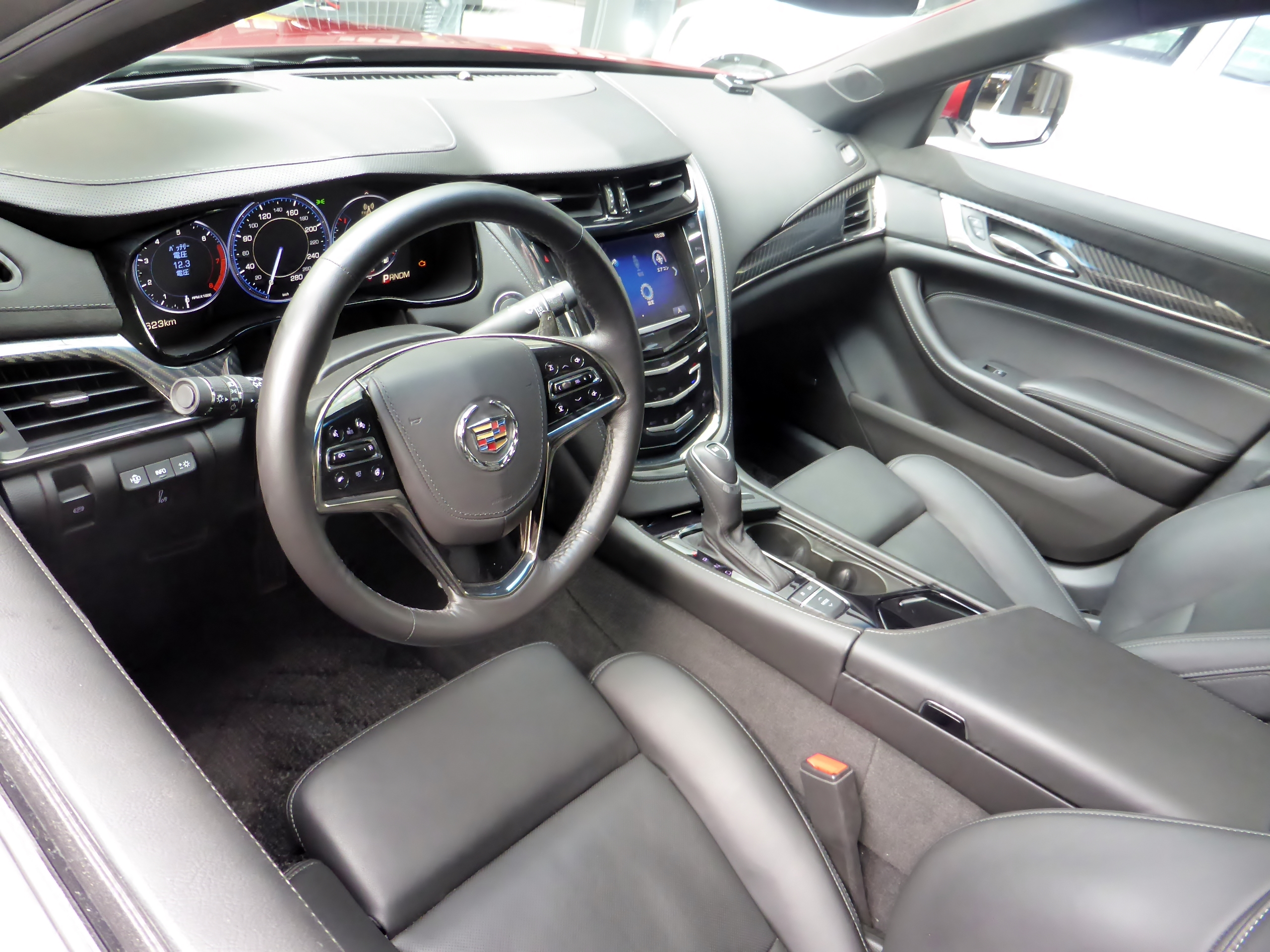
Interior

On March 26, 2013, Cadillac unveiled the third generation of the CTS. The 2014 CTS uses the 2.0L turbocharged I4 and 3.6L V6 from the ATS and also offers a new twin turbocharged V6 producing 420 hp (313 kW) and 430 lb⋅ft (583 N⋅m) of torque. The twin turbocharged engine was only available in the CTS Vsport, a new trim that served as a step between the 3.6L V6 and the high-performance CTS-V. Despite carrying the CTS name, the third-generation model is actually closer in size and market position to the former STS.

Bob Boniface and Robin Krieg designed the exterior of the third-generation CTS, while Eric Clough designed the interior. General Motors began assembling 2014 CTS sedans intended for sale to customers on September 16, 2013, with sales beginning in October 2013.

=== Reception ===
Motor Trend named the third-generation CTS its 2014 Car of the Year. As customary with award winners, the magazine acquired a CTS (in Vsport trim) for a long-term test. Its verdict lauded the car's driving dynamics and reliability, but criticized its CUE multi-media interface.

In a four-way comparison in the December 2013 issue of Car and Driver, the 2014 CTS 3.6 placed second overall. The article praised the handling of the CTS, stating that it was "the only car in this group that didn't just put up with hard driving, it indeed goaded its driver to go faster," and praised the stopping ability, stiff structure and light weight of the car. The article criticized the engine for being "coarse in the upper ranges", the acceleration times, the fuel economy and the CUE entertainment system.

Sales concerns led Cadillac to offer rebates to the 2014 models and lower sticker prices on the 2015 models.

=== Powertrains ===
All engines available in the 2014 CTS are constructed from cast aluminum blocks and heads, and use direct injection and variable valve timing.

For the 2016 model year, the 6-speed 6L45 automatic transmission was replaced by the new 8-speed 8L45 automatic transmission, with the 8L45 also taking over duties with the naturally aspirated 3.6L V6 from the 8-speed Aisin TL-80SN automatic transmission. V-Sport models will continue to use the 8-speed Aisin TL-80SN. A new 3.6L V6, the LGX, replaced the 3.6L V6 LFX.

2014 Cadillac CTS Powertrains
Displacement	Fuel	GM type	Configuration	Aspiration	Power	Torque	Layouts	Transmissions	Model years
2.0 L (1,998 cc)	Gasoline	LTG	I-4	Turbocharged	272 hp (203 kW) at 5,500 rpm	295 lb⋅ft (400 N⋅m) at 1,700–5,500 rpm	FR, F4 (optional)	6-speed automatic	2014–2019
3.6 L (3,564 cc)	Gasoline	LFX	V6	Natural	321 hp (239 kW) at 6,800 rpm	274 lb⋅ft (371 N⋅m) at 4,800 rpm	FR, F4 (optional)	6-speed automatic, 8-speed automatic (optional – RWD only)	2014–2015
3.6 L (3,649 cc)	Gasoline	LGX	V6	Natural	335 hp (250 kW) at 6,800 rpm	285 lb⋅ft (386 N⋅m) at 5,300 rpm	FR, F4 (optional)	8-speed automatic	2016–2019
3.6 L (3,564 cc)	Gasoline	LF3	V6	Twin turbocharged	420 hp (313 kW) at 5,750 rpm	430 lb⋅ft (583 N⋅m) at 3,500–4,500 rpm	FR	8-speed automatic	2014–2019
6.2 L (6,162 cc)	Gasoline	LT4	V8	Supercharged	640 hp (477 kW) at 6,400 rpm	630 lb⋅ft (854 N⋅m) at 3,600 rpm	FR	8-speed automatic	2016–2019

=== CTS-V (2016–2019) ===
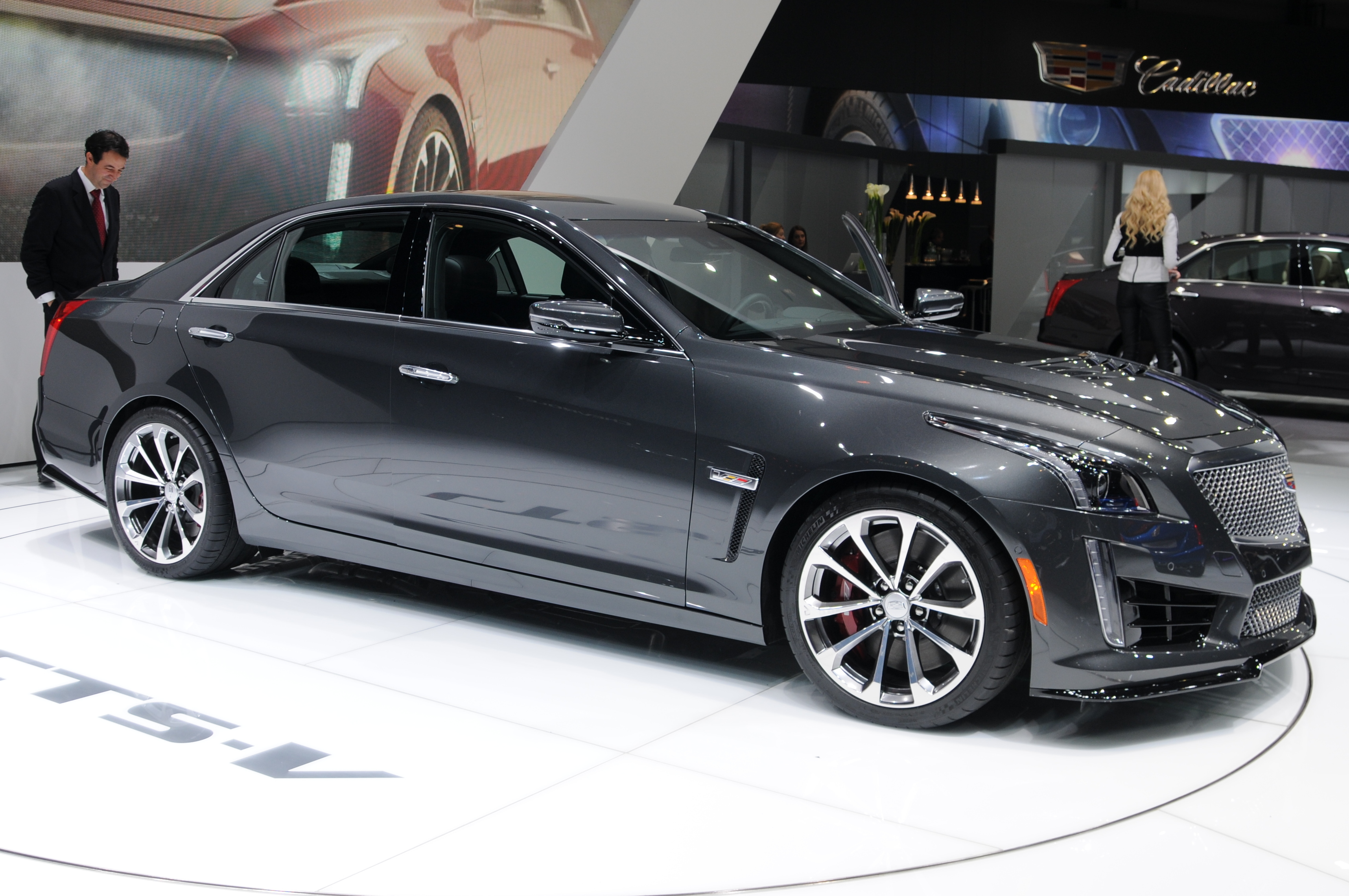
Cadillac CTS-V (third generation)

The third-generation CTS-V weighs 4,145 lb (1,880 kg) and includes a 6.2 L; 376.0 cu in (6,162 cc) 640 bhp (649 PS; 477 kW) at 6400 rpm and 630 lb⋅ft (854 N⋅m) of torque at 3600 rpm LT4 supercharged gasoline V8 engine, making it the most powerful Cadillac ever produced to date. The 2016 Cadillac CTS-V model, equipped with an 8-speed automatic transmission, was street tested with a best 0-60 mph (97 km/h) test time of 3.5 seconds.

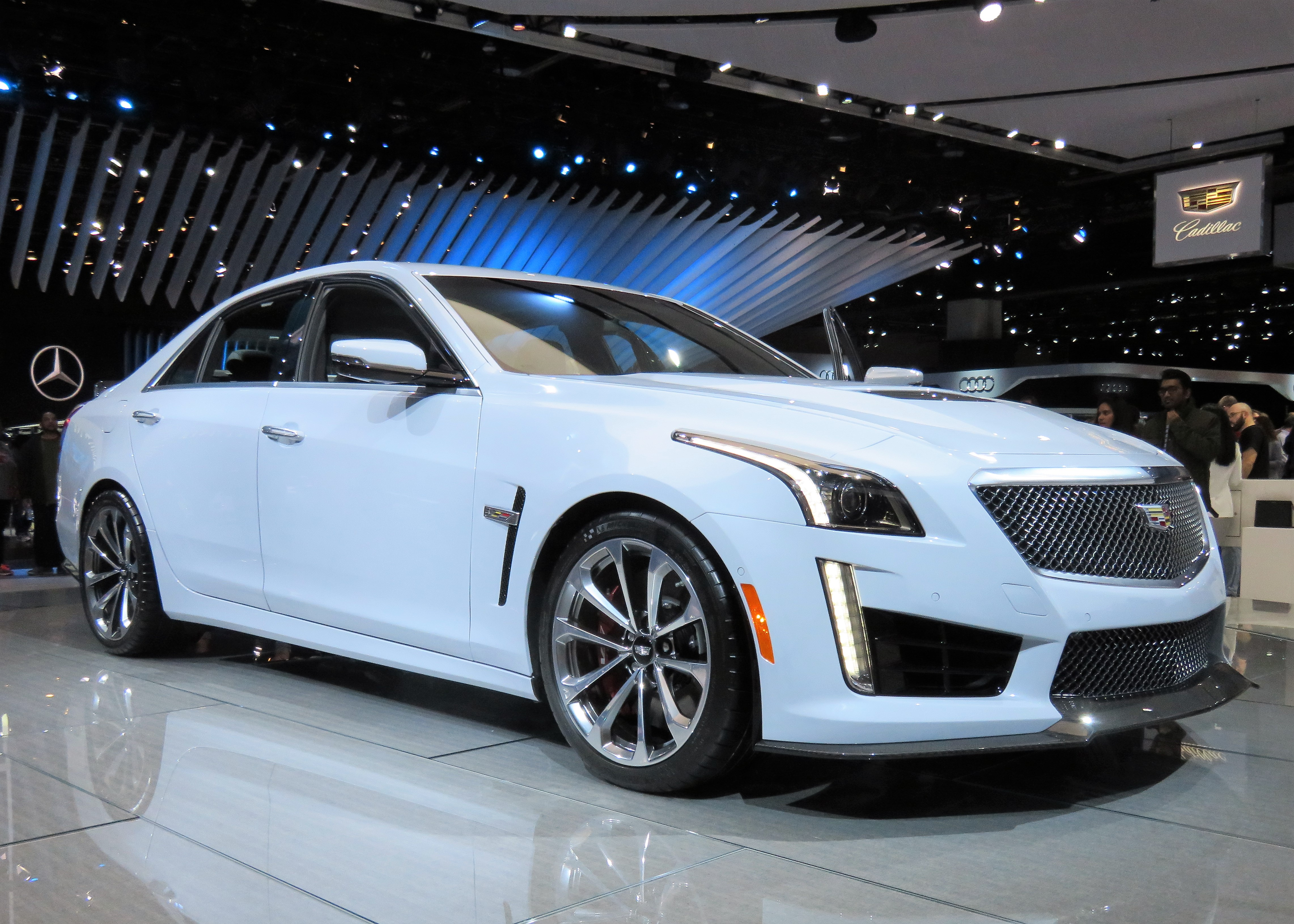
Cadillac CTS-V Glacier Metallic Edition at the 2018 North American International Auto Show

The CTS and CTS-V were discontinued after the 2019 model year. The CT5, built on an Alpha 2 platform, was scheduled to replace the CTS, and would also include a CT5 V series. Production ended in early 2019.

== Awards ==
In its first year of production, the first-generation CTS was nominated for the 2002 North American Car of the Year award. The gen-2 CTS/CTS-V won MotorWeek's Driver's Choice Awards for "Best Sport Sedan" in 2008 and 2009. The second-generation CTS won the 2008 Motor Trend Car of the Year award and was chosen as one of Car and Driver's 10Best cars.

In 2009, the second-generation CTS and CTS-V were chosen for Car and Driver's 10Best list, making the CTS the first Cadillac to be chosen twice in consecutive years. In 2010, the second-generation CTS and CTS-V returned to the Car and Driver 10Best list under the sub-headline "Maybe the best American car ever made". The CTS-V made the Car and Driver 10Best list again in 2011 and 2012.

The third-generation CTS won the 2014 Motor Trend Car of the Year award, and was chosen for Car and Driver's 10Best list for 2014. Also in 2014, the CTS ranked number one among upscale midsize cars, according to U.S. News & World Report.

== Marketing ==
The CTS was featured in the 2003 film The Matrix Reloaded, its producers seeking a car that would complement the film's atmosphere. General Motors suggested the then-unreleased CTS to the filmmakers. Ten prototypes, damaged to different extents, were used to represent the film's hero car, a silver CTS.

== Motorsports ==
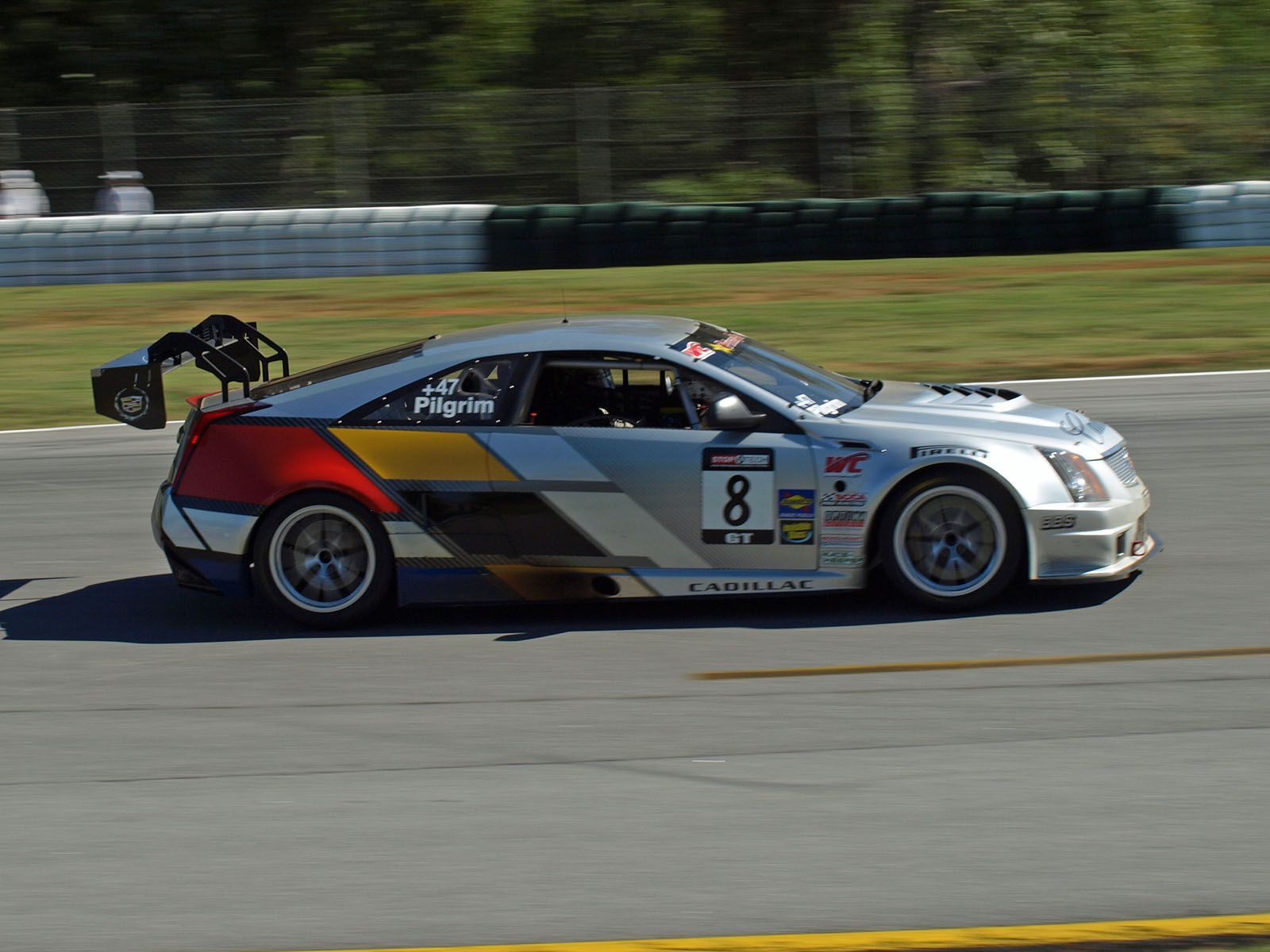
The CTS-V in 2011 at Road Atlanta

The CTS-V was raced in the SCCA World Challenge series. The first generation CTS-V sedan competed from 2004 to 2007, winning the manufacturer's championship in 2005 and 2007. Starting in 2011, the second-generation V competed as a coupe, winning Cadillac back-to-back manufacturer's championships in 2012 and 2013. The 2011 coupe race car was built by Pratt & Miller. For the 2015 season, the CTS-V was replaced by the Cadillac ATS-V.

== Production and sales ==
Total combined sales of all Cadillac CTS models by year.

Calendar year	United States	Canada	Global	Manual Trans
2002	37,976			
2003	49,392			3119 (M35)
2004	57,211			
2005	61,512			
2006	54,846			
2007	57,029			
2008	58,774			
2009	38,817			
2010	45,656			
2011	55,042			
2012	46,979			
2013	32,343			
2014	31,115	1,076	34,230	
2015	19,485	921	23,167	
2016	15,911			
2017	10,344			
2018	11,219			
2019	6,965			
2020	611			

CTS-V Production by model year

1st Gen CTS-V Model Year	Total U.S. sales
2004	2461
2005	3508
2006	3052
2007	1176
Total	10197

2nd Gen CTS-V Model Year	Sedan	Coupe	Wagon	Total
2009	3035	n/a	n/a	3035
2010	1745	1	n/a	1746
2011	1000	3224	395	4619
2012	2012	2286	575	4873
2013	1133	1519	416	3068
2014	362	998	753	2113
Total	9287	8028	2139	19454

3rd Gen CTS-V Model Year	Sedan
2016	1887
2017	1519
2018	1297 Last 19 piece European model.
Total	4703
