= Aisin AY transmission =

6-speed manual transmission

The AY-6 is a 6-speed manual transmission manufactured by Aisin. It is designed for longitudinal engine applications and can handle up to 345 lb⋅ft (468 N⋅m) of torque.

General Motors used the AY-6 as RPO MV1, MV5, and MV7.

== MV5 ==
Gear ratios:

1	2	3	4	5	6
4.48	2.58	1.63	1.19	1.00	0.75

Applications:

- 2010 Chevrolet Camaro

== MV7 ==
Gear ratios:

1	2	3	4	5	6
4.16	2.51	1.69	1.27	1.00	0.75

Applications:

- 2010 Cadillac CTS

Other applications:

- 2004 Holden VZ Commodore
- 2005 Holden VZ Ute
- 2005 Cadillac CTS
- 2004-2006 Toyota Tundra
- 2004-2015 Toyota Tacoma
- 2004- Toyota Land Cruiser Prado
- 2006 Holden VE Commodore
- 2005-2012 Lexus IS220d
- 2005-2012 Lexus IS250
- 2006-2017 Toyota FJ Cruiser
- 2007 Holden VE Commodore
- 2010 Chevrolet Camaro
- 2010-2012 Lexus IS200d
- 2010-2015 Chevrolet Camaro 1LT, 2LT, RS
- 2015, 2019 Toyota Mark X GRMN

== See also ==
- List of Aisin transmissions
