= Shift blocking =

Automotive transmission feature

Shift blocking is a feature of automobile manual transmissions added to improve fuel economy ratings in the Corporate Average Fuel Economy (CAFE) system by preventing a driver from switching from first gear to second or third as would be done normally. A solenoid prevents the shifter from engaging these gears, forcing the driver to shift from first to fourth gear. The solenoid is computer controlled, and will deactivate if the throttle is opened wide enough, or the car reaches speeds above those typical in city driving.

== Usage ==
The skip shift feature was originally introduced in the Chevrolet Corvette in the late 1980s, with the name CAGS (Computer-Aided Gear Selection), and is present on many sporting cars produced in the US from the 1990s onwards on every car fitted with the Tremec T-56 and TR-6060, including the Dodge Viper, Pontiac Firebird, 2004-2006 Pontiac GTO, Pontiac G8 GXP, V8/SS Chevrolet Camaro and Cadillac CTS-V.

== Criticism ==
The effect of the system on normal driving has been described as "dreaded", "awful" and "annoying". In 1994 Popular Science noted that "if something like an oncoming truck makes you change your mind, the car's response is doggedly slow."

== Eliminators ==
Owners manuals for the Corvettes in which it was first implemented contained photographs of the system components "captioned to caution drivers not to disconnect [the] wire, or the skip-shift function would no longer function." These photos, along with the continuing, decades-long ability to bypass the system easily with a simple resistor, make it clear that GM has never intended to make the system difficult to bypass. If anything, it has been made as simple as possible while still satisfying federal regulations. Skip shift eliminators are produced for quick and simple DIY installation to circumvent the GM CAGS system. In 2005, these were commercially available for about US$20 (equivalent to $29 in 2024)–$40, or could be made with a little soldering for about $7. Notably, neither workaround will eliminate the "1-4 skip shift" dash indicator light, which will continue to operate regardless. ECU tuning is required to eliminate the dash indicator light.
