= John Manoogian II =

Automobile designer

- Born: July 23, 1947
- Occupations: Automobile designer; industrial designer; adjunct faculty member; automotive industry expert
- Notable work: Cadillac Cimarron; Cadillac CTS, 2nd Generation with Bob Munson (lead designer) and Paul Scicluna (lead sculptor)

On graduating as a car designer:
"There was an article in Autoweek magazine years ago that made the assertion that it was easier to become a Professional NFL football player in the United States than it was to become a car designer.

That theory probably still holds true today. There are several top Transportation Design schools in the US: Art Center College of Design in Pasadena, CA, and the College for Creative Studies in Detroit, MI, and the Cleveland Institute of Arts, in Cleveland, OH. Europe boasts the RCA and Coventry in England, IED in Italy, Pforzheim in Germany, Strate in France, and several others. Korea has Hong-Ik University and the Chinese are developing their own educational resources.

All of this leads to the fact that combined, these top-tier schools graduate approximately 150-200 would be car designers per annum."

John, Manoogian II (January 21, 1991). "On graduating as a car designer". Autoweek. Hearst Communications.

John Manoogian II (born July 23, 1947) is an automobile designer, industrial designer, adjunct faculty member, and automotive industry expert — widely known for his nearly 33-year career with General Motors, where he designed for the company's Chevrolet, Pontiac, Saturn, Buick, Oldsmobile and Cadillac divisions.

At Cadillac, Manoogian's work ranged from the hastily conceived and oft-derided Cimarron to the second generation Cadillac CTS Coupe, winner of the Motor Trend Car of the Year, Best Concept Car Design & Best Vehicle Design award at the 2008 North American International Auto Show, as well as the production and concept categories at EyesOn Design, an event judged by noted vehicle designers.

After General Motors, Manoogian has served on the faculty at the College of Creative Studies as well as design director with Quadrobot Corporation, developers of a last mile, autonomous electric delivery vehicle.

Manoogian contributes regularly online at Driven to Write, recounting his design career under the byline JM2.

== Early life ==
Manoogian was born in Detroit to Rose Violet Manoogian (1922–2018) and John Albert Manoogian (1921–2016), a former Marine in World War II — and later, manager of the Alpha Project, Ford Motor Company's advanced manufacturing program.

Manoogian grew up in Michigan and after working as a designer/clay sculptor for Ford Motor Company, returned to school and received a B.A. in Transportation Design from the Art Center College of Design, Los Angeles— and subsequently an M.B.A. from Oakland University, Rochester, MI.

== Career ==
On the Cadillac CTS Coupe: "the car's development cost was paid when the company did the sedan. All of the internal architecture, the drivetrain, the cowl, and most of the components, are those of the sedan and have, thereby, already been budgeted. So, this car is pretty close to a freebie, as an investment by the company."

— John Manoogian II

On the Cadillac CTS Coupe: "Each line and angle of the bodywork was carefully honed, and the final design's proportions were judged by the eyes of the design team, not computer-generated math data."

— John Manoogian II

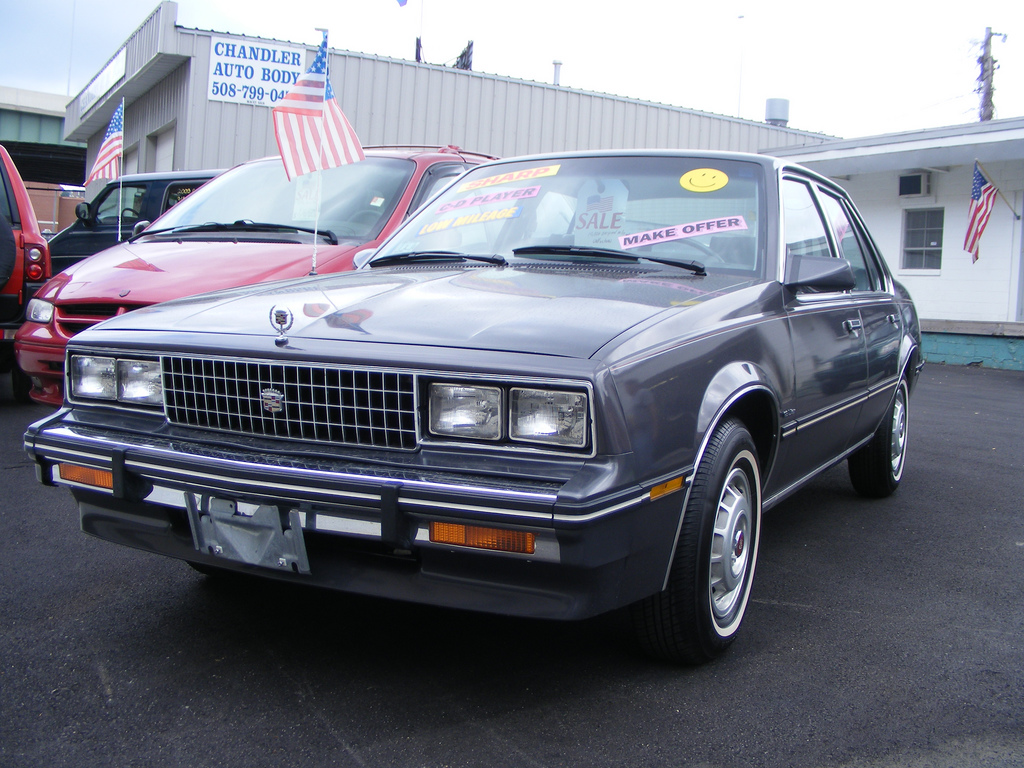
1982 Cadillac Cimarron, front

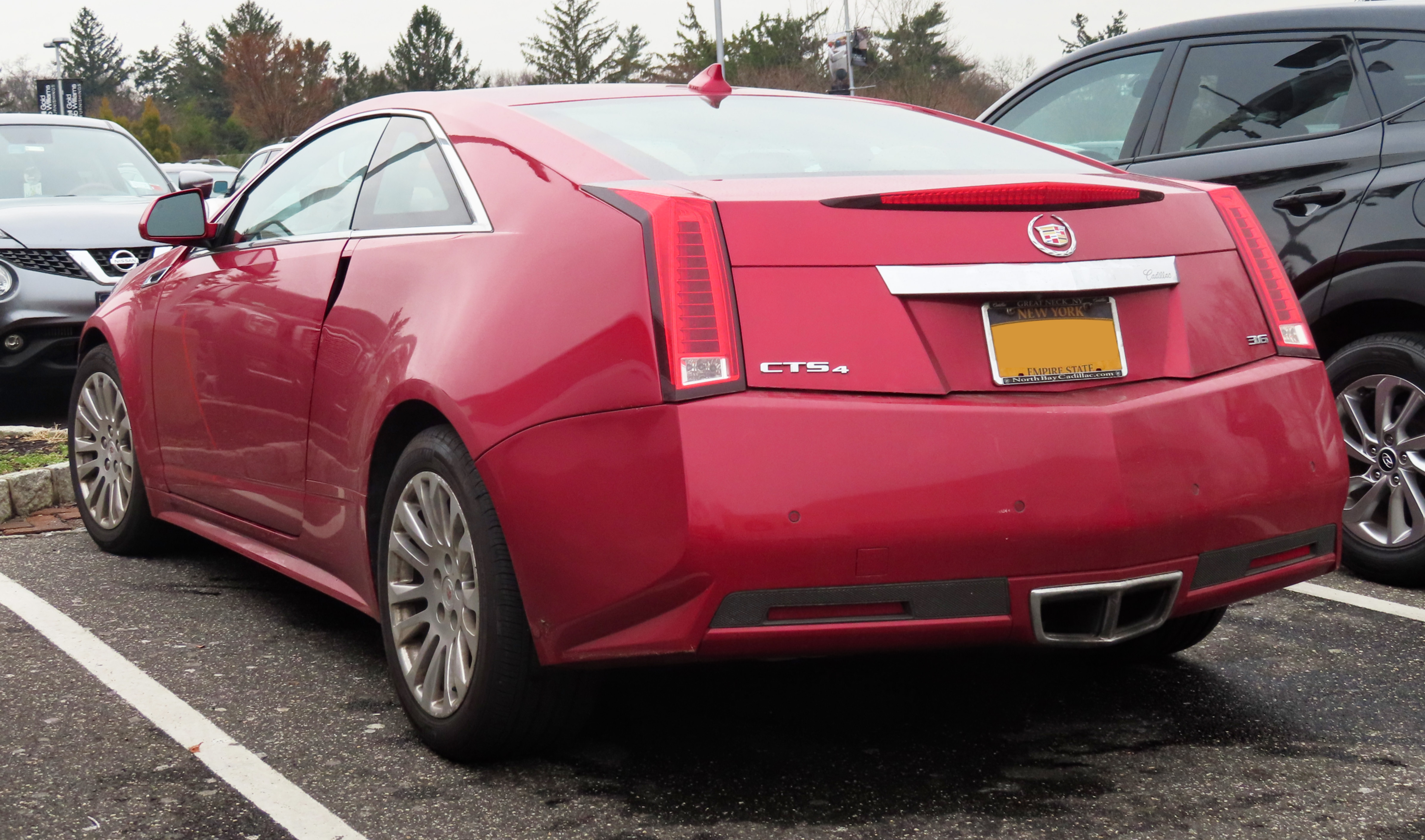
2012 Cadillac CTS coupe

After joining the General Motors Design Staff in 1976, Manoogian acted as Assistant Chief Designer at Saturn Exterior, Pontiac Exterior, Cadillac Exterior; Chief Designer at Pontiac Exterior; Executive Vehicle Chief Designer at Buick, Chevrolet, Pontiac Exterior; and Director of Design at Cadillac Exterior. He designed two presidential limousines, 2006 and 2009; and interviewed and hired college graduates for design positions at GM Design. He has served as a Sheet Metal Subject Matter Expert and holds 3 design patents. Manoogian had the task of proposing which vehicles to sell and which to keep from the more than 900 in the GM Heritage Center's pre-bankruptcy collection.

Manoogian formed a design consultancy, Forzablitz, and has acted as an automotive design patent expert witness. He taught for seven years at the College of Creative Studies. As an industry speaker, he has addressed the Industrial Designer's Society of America Annual Michigan conference on Transportation and the Portland Art Museum and has participated with numerous car clubs; appeared in the documentary "Detroit in Overdrive;" and acted as a design judge at the La Jolla, California Concours d'Elegance, Meadowbrook Concours, and EyesOn Design Automotive Design Exhibition.

In 2020, Manoogian served as Director of Design for Quadrobot Corporation, founded in 2017 by Mike Tianye Wang, a former student of Manoogian. The company is developing an autonomous, electric last mile delivery vehicle.

As an industry insider, Manoogian continues to participate in automotive discussions and roundtables, often sharing his personal experience as a designer. On the YouTube Rare Classic Cars & Automotive History channel, he has conducted a series of interviews on the process of designing cars and his experience designing particular models.

=== Portfolio ===
- 1981 Cadillac Cimarron
- 1985 Cadillac Deville,
- 1992 Pontiac Grand Am
- 1996 Pontiac Grand Prix,
- 2004 Pontiac Grand Prix
- 2005 Cadillac DTS
- 2006 Chevrolet Impala, Buick Lucerne
- 2008 Cadillac CTS
- 2006 and 2009 USA Presidential Limousines
