= Allure =

Allure may refer to:

- Interpersonal attraction
- Seduction, or persuasion to engage in a behavior, often romantic

== Film ==
- Allure (2014 film), an American film by Vladan Nikolic
- Allure (2017 film), a Canadian film by Carlos and Jason Sanchez
- Allures (film), a 1961 American short by Jordan Belson

== Music ==
- Allure (band), an American R&B group
  - Allure (album), by Allure, 1997
- Allure (EP), by Hyomin, 2019
- Tiësto, Dutch DJ and producer who has also recorded as Allure
- "Allures", a 2000–2001 composition by François Bayle
- "Allure", a song by Jay-Z from The Black Album

== Other uses ==
- Alure, or allure, a passage behind the parapet of a church
- Allure (fortification), or chemin de ronde, a raised protected walkway behind a castle battlement
- Allure (magazine), an American women's magazine
- Allure Las Vegas, a condominium project in Las Vegas, Nevada, US
- Buick Allure, the Canadian-market name for the Buick LaCrosse
- MS Allure of the Seas, a cruise ship owned by Royal Caribbean International

== See also ==
- Allura (disambiguation)
- Allured (disambiguation)
- Alured (disambiguation)
