= Alura =

Alura may refer to:

- Alura Coaches, Australian tourist operator
- Alura people, an Australian ethnic group
- Alura (genus), a genus of moths
- Alura (DC Comics), a fictional character
- Alura, a fictional character in Buck Rogers
- Alura (EP), an EP by Sweet Trip

== See also ==
- Allura (disambiguation)
- Alure
