= Allured =

Allured may refer to:

- Allured (archdeacon of Barnstaple)
- Allured Business Media, an American print media company
- Allured Mines, a mine that operated in the Ivanpah Mountains, California, US
- Donald E. Allured (born 1922), American handbell choir director, composer, and arranger
- Malcolm Allured (born 1945), British musician; former member of Showaddywaddy

== See also ==
- Allure (disambiguation)
- Alured (disambiguation)
