= Buick Velite =

Buick Velite may refer to:

- Buick Velite, a 2004 concept car
- Buick Velite 6, a production electric car introduced in China in 2019 which is unique to that market
- Buick Velite 7, a production electric car introduced in China in 2020 which is unique to that market
