= Allura =

Allura may refer to:

- Allura, Karnataka, a village in Bidar district, Karnataka, India
- Apache Allura, software
- Lady Allura, a fictional character from The Legend of Vox Machina
- Princess Allura, a fictional character
- Allura Red AC, a dye

== See also ==
- Alura (disambiguation)
- Allure (disambiguation)
