= Cosmetics & Toiletries =

American cosmetic magazine

Cosmetics & Toiletries magazine
- Senior editor: Rachel Grabenhofer
- Categories: Personal care R&D
- Frequency: monthly
- Founded: 1906
- Company: Allured Business Media
- Country: United States
- Based in: Northbrook, Illinois
- Language: English
- Website: http://www.cosmeticsandtoiletries.com

Cosmetics & Toiletries (C&T) is a magazine focusing on research and development in the cosmetics and personal care industry. The magazine is published by Allured Business Media. It is delivered to 97 countries on a monthly basis, and is geared toward formulators, scientists, researchers, chemists and R&D management in the industry. The magazine is available in both print and online magazine format. The headquarters is in Northbrook, Illinois.

== History ==
The publication began in March 1906 as "The American Perfumer", a monthly magazine published by Ungerer & Company. In September 1906, the name changed to "The American Perfumer and Essential Oil Review", and the publisher changed to The Perfumer Publishing Company. At that time, the perfumery business was more prominent than cosmetics. By 1935, the Moore Publishing Company bought the magazine. In 1956, Maison G. deNavarre had been writing and editing for the magazine for 24 years, and in January of that year, the owners again changed the magazine's name to "American Perfumer and Aromatics". The publication focused on perfumery, aromatics and flavors, but deNavarre incorporated the occasional personal care product; for example, hand creams and royal jelly. In the early years of the magazine, there was no mandatory labeling of product ingredients, and cosmetic companies were afraid to have their scientists publish for fear of giving away trade secrets.

In March 1960, the Allured family purchased the "American Perfumer and Aromatics" from Moore Publishing. In 1961, the name was changed again to "American Perfumer and Cosmetics". The owners explained this change in the June 1962 issue: “The change in name that you see on the cover, and on top of this page, is in belated recognition of an editorial fact of over 30 years’ duration. During this period this magazine has gradually meant more and more to the cosmetic chemist and pharmacist, as these specialties became the major customer for fragrances. In turn, the perfumer has been more and more involved in the technical problems that new cosmetic materials have forced upon him.”

In January 1972 the name was changed to American Cosmetics and Perfumery, recognizing the changes taking place in cosmetic raw materials, cosmetic research and development, and cosmetic business in general. The publisher, Stanley E. Allured, believed the future of the personal care industry existed in new cosmetic raw materials and in new cosmetic product ideas. He would canvass cosmetics companies and hold meetings with R&D vice presidents and laboratory managers to determine what should be covered in the magazine, as well as to encourage them to write articles for the magazine. In 1973 the title was changed again to Cosmetics and Perfumery. In January 1976, the publication was divided into two separate magazines: Perfumer & Flavorist and Cosmetics and Toiletries. In January 1979, an ampersand was substituted in Cosmetics and Toiletries to produce the current title, Cosmetics & Toiletries.

== Other editions ==
Cosmetics & Toiletries Brazil is the Brazilian version of Cosmetics & Toiletries magazine, published nine times per year in Portuguese.

Cosmetics & Toiletries E-newsletter is a weekly e-newsletter, with news, trends and formulations via e-mail.

Cosmetics & Toiletries Bench Reference is a directory of cosmetic ingredients and sources for raw materials.
