= Alured (disambiguation) =

Alured (died 1160) was a bishop of Worcester.

Alured may also refer to:

== Given name ==
- Alured Arnold Callin (1924–2015), Manx politician
- Alured Clarke (1744–1832), British Army officer
- Alured Clarke (priest) (1696–1742), Dean of Exeter 1741–1742
- Alured Dumbell (1835–1900), Manx judge and Clerk of the Rolls
- Alured Ransom (1908-1992), American sports coach

== Surname ==
- John Alured (1607–1651), English MP and army officer
- Thomas Alured (1583–1638), English landowner and politician
- Thomas Alured (died 1562), or Thomas Aldred (by 1515–1562), English politician

== See also ==
- Alfred (disambiguation)
- Allure (disambiguation)
- Allured (disambiguation)
