= Buick LaCrosse =

Mid-size sedan

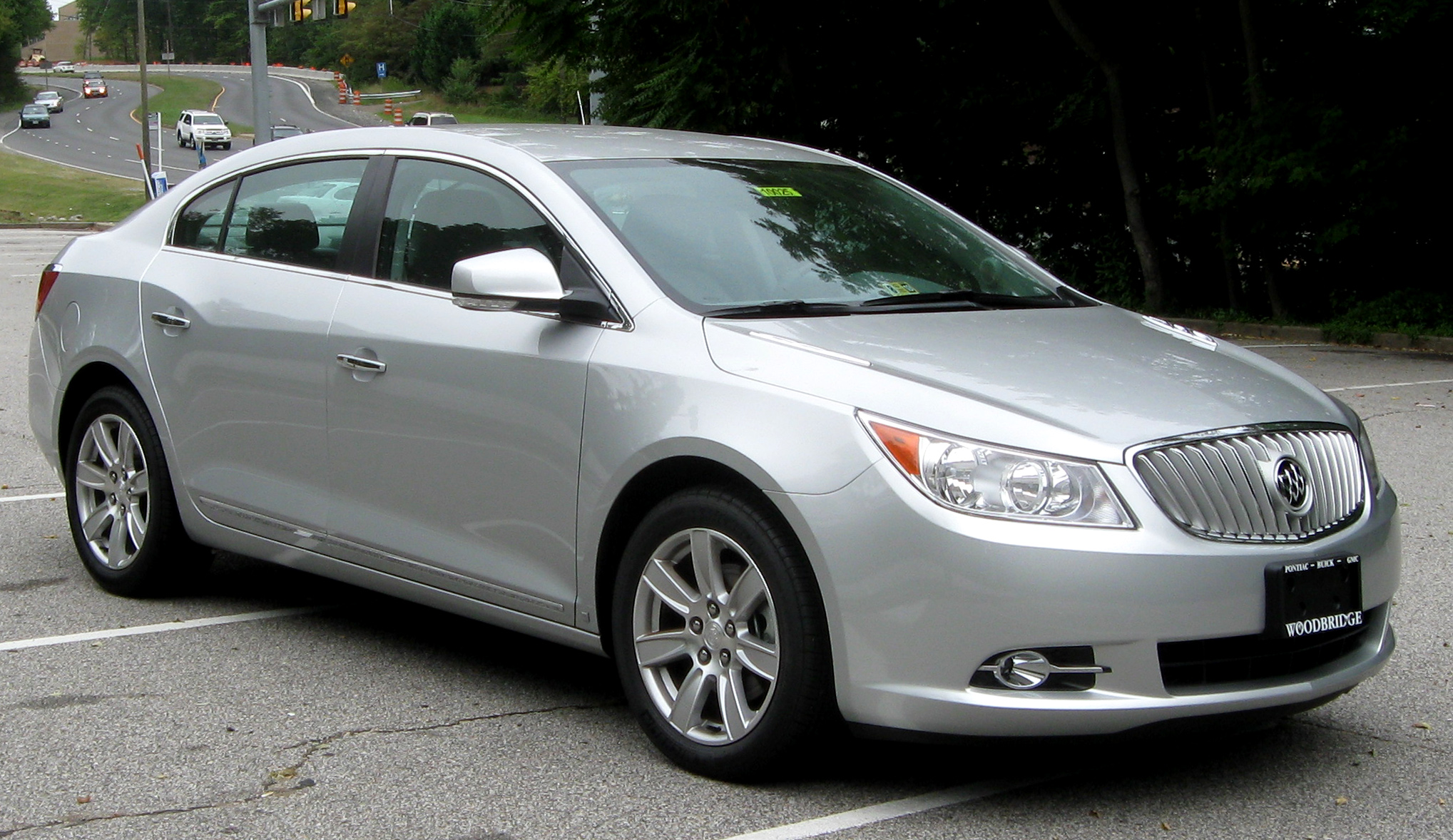
- 2010 Buick LaCrosse CXL

Overview
- Manufacturer: Buick (General Motors)
- Also called: Buick Allure (Canada, 2005–2010); Alpheon (South Korea, 2010–2015)
- Production: September 7, 2004 – February 15, 2019 (US); February 2006–present (China)
- Model years: 2005–2019 (US); 2006–present (China)

Body and chassis
- Class: Mid-size car
- Body style: 4-door sedan
- Layout: Front-engine, front-wheel drive Front-engine, four-wheel drive (2010–present)

Chronology
- Predecessor: Buick Century (for 2005); Buick Regal (for 2005); Buick Lucerne (for 2012)

The Buick LaCrosse is a four-door, front-wheel-drive sedan manufactured by Buick since the 2005 model year, and marketed variously across four generations for the North American and Chinese markets.

The first-generation LaCrosse replaced the Century and Regal in North America beginning for the 2005 model year as a five- or six-passenger, four-door, front-wheel-drive, V6-powered sedan using GM's mid-size W platform—and marketed in Canada as the Buick Allure. Notably, the first generation was also offered with a V8 engine, as a high-performance sub-model marketed as the LaCrosse Super (2008–2009). LaCrosse production and marketing began for China with the 2006 model year.

The second-generation LaCrosse was introduced for 2010 as a larger premium sedan for North American and Chinese markets using a long-wheelbase (LWB) variant of the Epsilon II platform shared with the Cadillac XTS—and available solely as a five-passenger sedan with a range of four- and six-cylinder engines.

The third generation was introduced for North America and China for the 2017 model year using the GM Epsilon platform shared with the Chevrolet Impala, notably offering a mild hybrid powertrain combining 20-kilowatt (27 hp) electric and 2.5-liter Ecotec gasoline engine. North American production ended with the third generation, with the 2019 model year; however, it continued to be offered in China, with a 2019 facelift.

The fourth-generation LaCrosse, launched in 2023, is currently manufactured and marketed solely in China. It is powered by a turbocharged 1.5-liter or 2.0-liter four-cylinder engine.

== Background and name ==
In the year 2000, Buick showcased a LaCrosse concept featuring styling features that referred to Buicks of the late 1940s including a descending swage line (featured on Buicks starting in 1940 and sporadically until the 1970s) and front fender port holes. Unique features included a removable rear roof and trunk panel (converting the trunk into a truck bed) and voice recognition instead of traditional switches for basic interior functions. The Buick LaCrosse concept was based on the GM G body shared with the Buick Park Avenue.

As the Buick nameplate, the term lacrosse refers to the sport. Out of caution, GM chose to market the model in Canada as the Allure because the words "faire la crosse (make the cross)" are a slang Québecoise phrase meaning "to masturbate"—even though the words la crosse themselves translate as "the cross" in French and are not generally problematic.

== First generation (2005) ==
=== North America ===
First generation (North America)
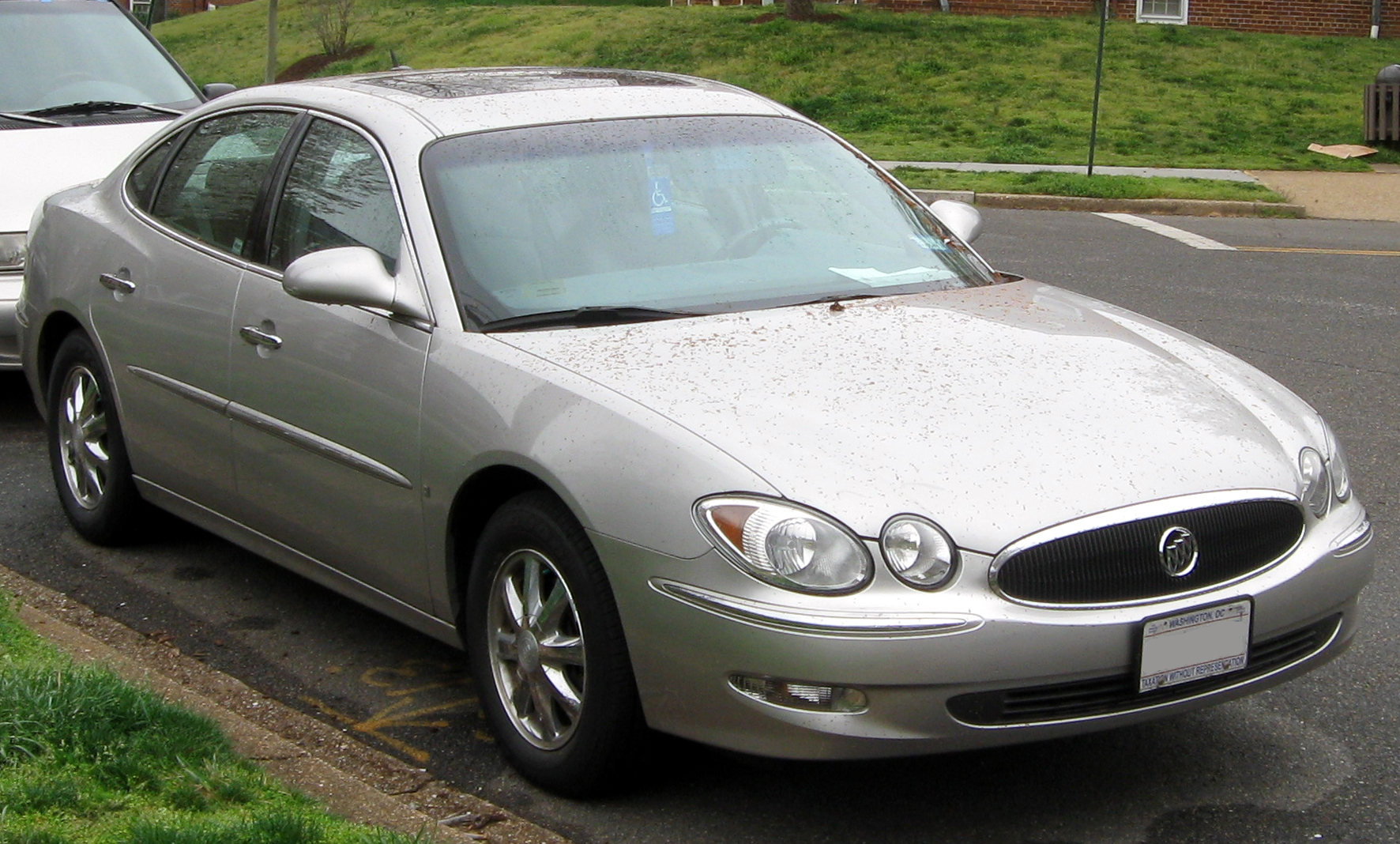
- Pre-facelift Buick LaCrosse

Overview
- Also called: Buick Allure (Canada)
- Production: September 7, 2004 – December 23, 2008
- Model years: 2005–2009; 2007–2009 (China)
- Assembly: Canada: Oshawa, Ontario (Oshawa Car Assembly); China: Shanghai (Shanghai GM); Taiwan: Miaoli County (Yulon GM)
- Designer: Wayne Cherry (2001); James C. Shyr (2006 interior; 2007 exterior)

Body and chassis
- Class: Mid-size
- Layout: Transverse front-engine, front-wheel drive
- Platform: W-body/GMX365
- Related: Chevrolet Impala; Chevrolet Monte Carlo; Pontiac Grand Prix

Powertrain
- Engine: 2.4 L LE5 I4 (China); 3.0 L LZD/LZC V6 (China); 3.6 L LY7 V6; 3.8 L L26 V6; 5.3 L LS4 V8
- Transmission: 4-speed 4T65-E automatic; 4-speed 4T65E-HD automatic; 6-speed automatic (China)

Dimensions
- Wheelbase: 110.5 in (2,807 mm)
- Length: 198.1 in (5,032 mm); 196.8 in (4,998 mm) (China)
- Width: 73.0 in (1,854 mm); 72.9 in (1,851 mm) (China)
- Height: 57.4 in (1,458 mm); 57.5 in (1,461 mm) (China)

The first generation LaCrosse debuted in late 2004 as a 2005 model, replacing the Century and Regal—solely as a four-door, front-drive sedan. The nameplate was borrowed from the 2000 Buick concept of the same name.

Using the MS2000 variant of GM's long-lived front-drive W-body platform, the LaCrosse was initially available with two powerplants and three trim levels: a 3.8 L 3800 Series III V6 available in CX and mid-level CXL, and a 3.6 L HFV6 V6 in the CXS model. The CXS was replaced by the LaCrosse Super sub-model in North American markets, with the CXS available partly through the 2008 model year. Sales of the CXS continued in Canada until January 1, 2008.

Structurally, the engine cradle, previously steel, was replaced by a stiffer, stronger, and lighter extruded aluminum cradle, weighing 20 pounds less. The LaCrosse used more high-strength steel than its predecessors, as well as a magnesium cross-car beam behind the instrument panel, another cross-car beam behind the rear seats, steel reinforcements in the rocker panels, interlocking door latch system, high-strength steel door beams, and a double-thick Quiet Steel floor pan and firewalls.

CX and CXL models used the 4T65-E automatic transmission and Super models used the 4T65-E HD variant. The LaCrosse, along with all other GM vehicles powered by the 3.8 L V6, became the first SULEV-compliant vehicles for 2006. All models were manufactured at GM Oshawa Assembly. Front driver and passenger airbags were standard, with optional side curtain airbags — which became standard for 2006.

All LaCrosse models featured an acoustic package, marketed by Buick as QuietTuning, to reduce, block, and absorb cabin noise. Features of the system included acoustical windshield and front side laminated glass; steel laminate on the front-of-dash body area; expanded baffles in the roof pillars; melt-on sound deadeners throughout the entire lower body structure; and sound-absorbing material throughout the engine, passenger, and cargo compartments.

Buick offered the LaCrosse as a five-passenger sedan, using front bucket seats and a console-mounted shifter, the console integrating with the upper instrument panel. At extra cost, a six-passenger configuration was available where the front seats shared a center flexible console that could fold up for a sixth passenger or fold out to provide a storage console, the transmission using a column-mounted shifter.

Regarding its styling, noted automotive journalist Warren Brown described the Lacrosse as a "delightful rendition of the automobile as functional art."

The final first-generation LaCrosse was manufactured on December 23, 2008. North American sales reached roughly 290,000 from 2005 to 2009, and the 2009 model was the last GM car using the company's noted and long-lived 3800 V6 engine.

==== 2008 facelift ====
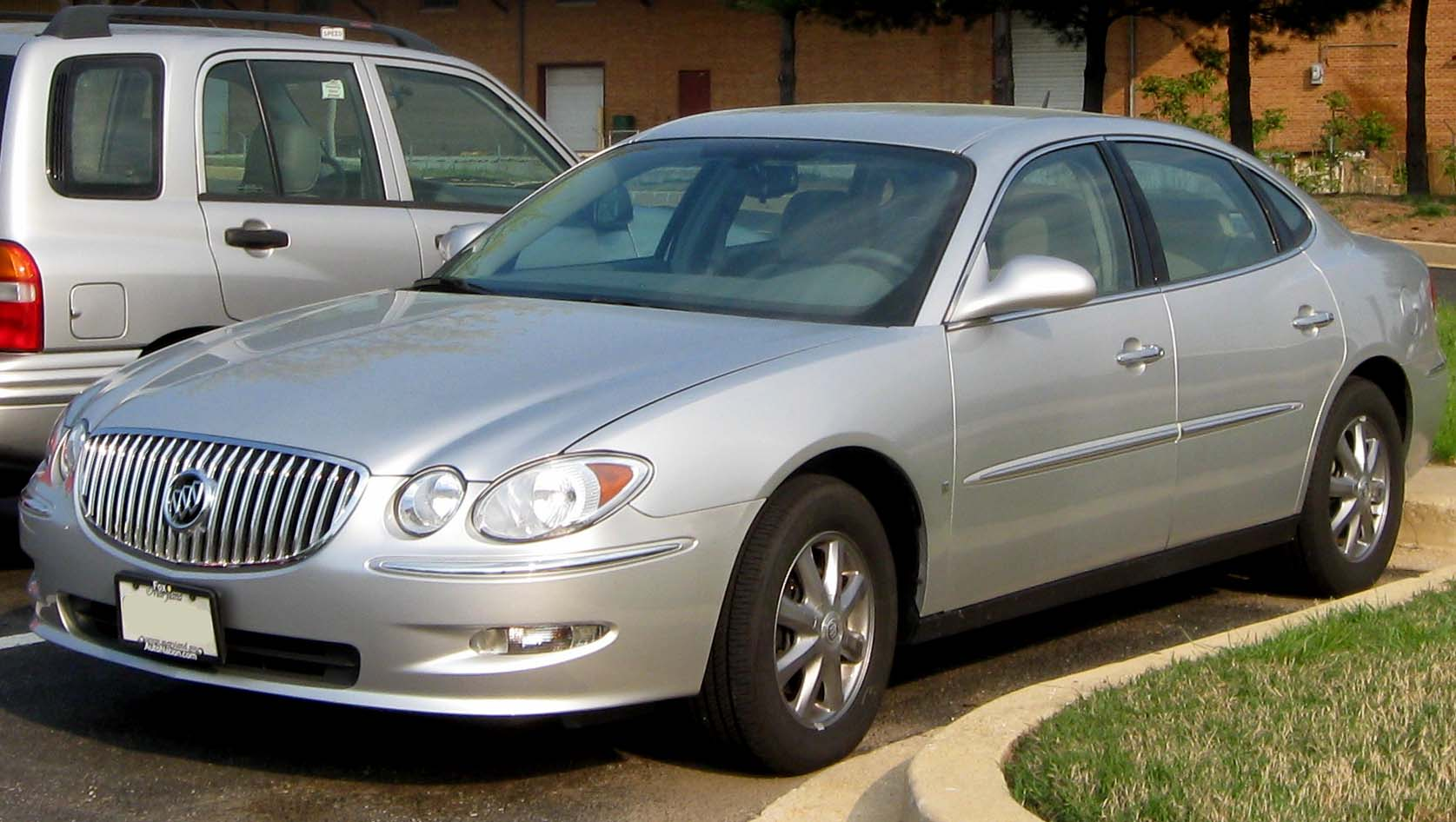
2008–2009 Buick LaCrosse

The LaCrosse received a facelift for 2008 with the vehicle's revised front design based on the Buick Velite concept and later used by the first generation Chinese LaCrosse.

All trim levels received a chrome exterior appearance package, factory remote start feature, XM Satellite Radio, telescoping steering wheel column, redundant steering wheel and climate control as added standard equipment (audio only post-2006). CX included a leather-wrapped steering wheel, theft-deterrent system, illuminated vanity mirrors, driver information center personalization, and hydraulic struts supporting both the engine hood and trunk lid.

For the 2009 model year, the last of the first generation, heated outside rearview mirrors became standard on all models; a 60/40 split folding rear seat added to Driver Confidence Package; navigation became available via OnStar; Bluetooth became available on all models with includes integrated steering wheel controls; 16-inch painted aluminum wheel were standard on CX models and 17-inch chrome-clad wheels became available on CX models.

==== LaCrosse Super (2008–2009) ====
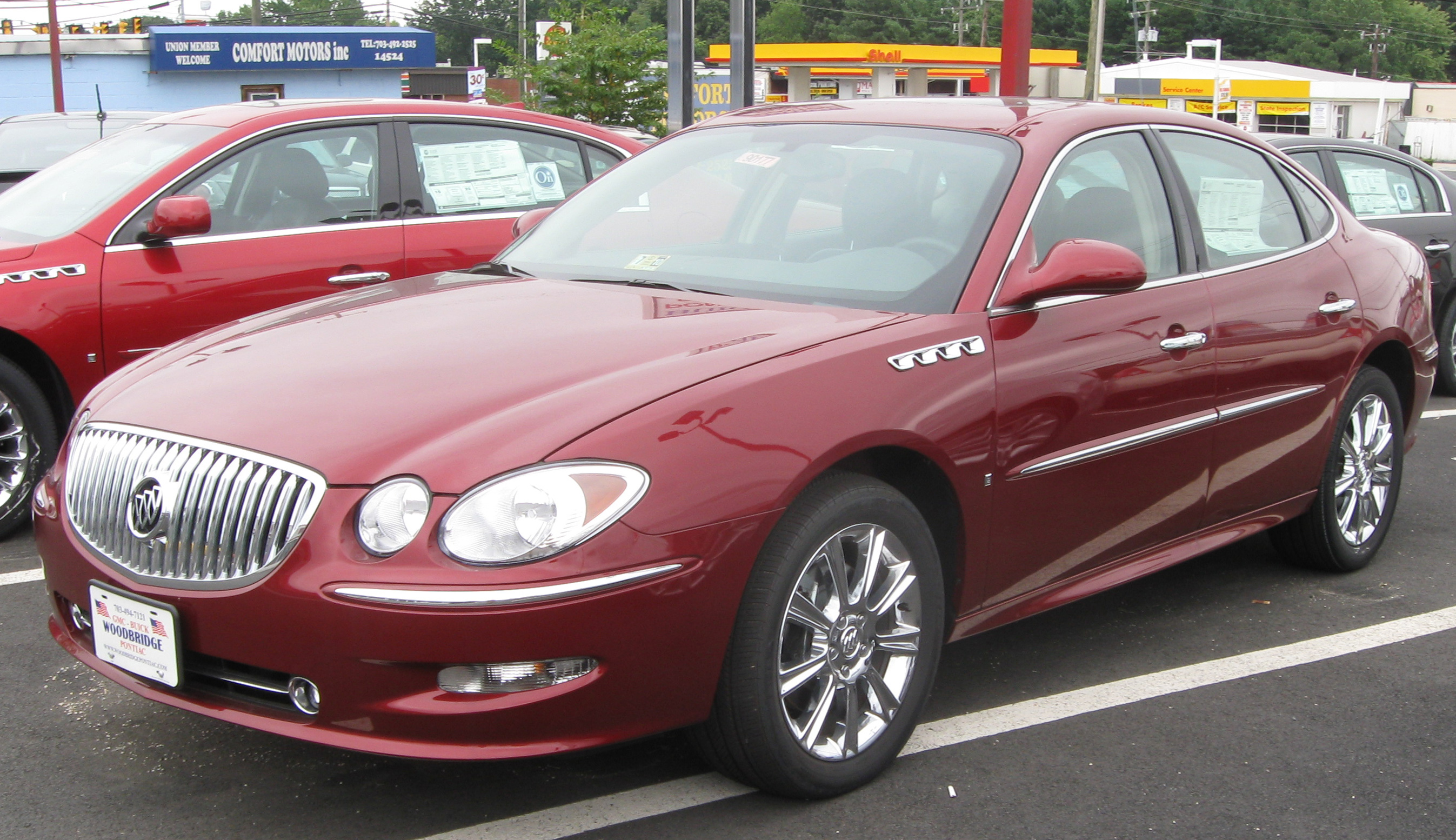
2009 Buick LaCrosse Super

To coincide its introduction with the first generation's 2008 facelift, Buick previewed the LaCrosse Super in March 2006 in New York and again at the Buick Open in Grand Blanc, Michigan, in July 2006, presenting it formally at the 2007 New York International Auto Show—as a higher-content, higher-performance, and more exclusive LaCrosse sub-model.

Resurrecting the Super nameplate from Buick's 1930s–1950s model, the model featured minor interior and exterior tweaks as well as a 5.3-liter, 300-hp V8 engine shared with the Pontiac Grand Prix GXP and Chevrolet Impala SS, and Monte Carlo SS—engineered under the direction of former Corvette engineer John Heinricy with the GM Performance Division. Noting that the Super would share parts with Chevrolet and Pontiac variants, Heinricy said the LaCrosse aimed to balance performance and refinement for a smoother, quieter and more grown-up demeanor.

The Super's LS4 5.3 L V8 engine made 300 hp (224 kW) and 323 lb⋅ft (438 N⋅m), used premium fuel, and featured variable displacement technology (marketed as Active Fuel Management), capable of deactivating four of its eight cylinders to save fuel. It was noted for its factory top speed of 150 mph (240 km/h) and a 0–60 mph time of 5.7 seconds.

The Super used the heavier duty 4T65-E HD four-speed automatic transmission, magnetically sensitive variable-effort power steering (marketed as Magnasteer), and a steering rack with closer-fitting gear teeth, tighter bushings, and a stiffer torsion rod controlling the variable-effort power assist. Chassis tuning featured Bilstein mono-tube struts; larger rotors at all four disc brakes; full-range, powertrain- and brake-modulated traction control; revised suspension tuning with standard electronic stability control, marketed as Stabilitrak; dual exhaust with two 3.5-inch chrome tips; and 18-inch cast aluminum wheels with P235/50R18 all-season tires.

The exterior featured Buick's hallmark fender-mounted VentiPorts; a revised front fascia incorporating the larger and more pronounced 2008 upper grille (recalling Buick's Velite concept), lower grille chrome trim with chrome bezels for projector beam fog lights, revised side rocker moldings, a very small deck-mounted rear spoiler, and a revised rear fascia with integrated parking sensors. Exterior color choices were brown, black, red, and silver—marketed as Mocha Brown Metallic, Black Onyx, Red Jewel Tincoat, and Platinum Metallic.

Interior features included a blue-faced instrument cluster with Super badging, dark faux chestnut wood trim, enhanced front seatback bolstering, split fold-down rear seats, redundant steering wheel–mounted radio and cruise controls, leather seating surfaces with inserts embossed to mimic woven leather (marketed as Dream Weave), heated front seats, remote start, premium sound system with nine speakers (marketed as Concert III), OnStar, and optional Bluetooth wireless technology. Upholstery colors were Platinum (light beige) and Mocha Brown (dark brown).

The 2008 base price for the LaCrosse Super was $32,820 (equivalent to $50,960 in 2025), which rose to $33,805 for 2009. Assembled alongside other LaCrosse models at GM's Oshawa Car Assembly Plant 2, sales reached 2,277 for 2008 and 139 for 2009.

==== Safety ====
The LaCrosse received a Good overall score in the Insurance Institute for Highway Safety's frontal impact crash test and a Marginal overall rating in the side impact test. Injury measurements for the side-impact crash test include a Poor mark for the driver's torso and a Marginal score for the driver's pelvis and leg. Side airbags are limited to the curtain type for both front and rear rows; the torso-type side airbag is unavailable. 2007 models also earned one out of five stars in a National Highway Traffic Safety Administration side-impact crash test. The IIHS also found that the 2006–08 LaCrosse had the second-highest fatality rate in the large four-door car class; only the Buick Lucerne fared worse.

==== Models ====
Years	Models	Engine	Displacement	Horsepower	Torque	EPA Fuel Economy Ratings
2005–2009	CX; CXL	3.8 L L26 V6	231 cu in (3791 cc)	200 hp (149 kW) @ 5200 rpm	230 lb⋅ft (312 N⋅m) @ 4000 rpm	City: 17 mpg_{‑US} (14 L/100 km; 20 mpg_{‑imp}); Hwy: 28 mpg_{‑US} (8.4 L/100 km; 34 mpg_{‑imp})
2005–2008	CXS	3.6 L LY7 V6	217 cu in (3564 cc)	240 hp (179 kW) @ 6000 rpm	225 lb⋅ft (305 N⋅m) @ 2000 rpm	City: 17 mpg_{‑US} (14 L/100 km; 20 mpg_{‑imp}); Hwy: 25 mpg_{‑US} (9.4 L/100 km; 30 mpg_{‑imp})
2008–2009	Super	5.3 L LS4 V8	325 cu in (5327 cc)	300 hp (224 kW) @ 5600 rpm	323 lb⋅ft (438 N⋅m) @ 4000 rpm	City: 16 mpg_{‑US} (15 L/100 km; 19 mpg_{‑imp}); Hwy: 24 mpg_{‑US} (9.8 L/100 km; 29 mpg_{‑imp})

=== China ===
Shanghai GM introduced the Buick LaCrosse (Chinese: 别克君越) in February 2006, as a more upscale companion to its Buick Regal sedan. Designed by Shanghai GM's Pan Asia Technical Automotive Center (PATAC), the Chinese LaCrosse is based on the same architecture as the North American model, with different exterior sheetmetal, interior design and available engines. The car is also manufactured in Taiwan by a joint Yulon–GM venture.

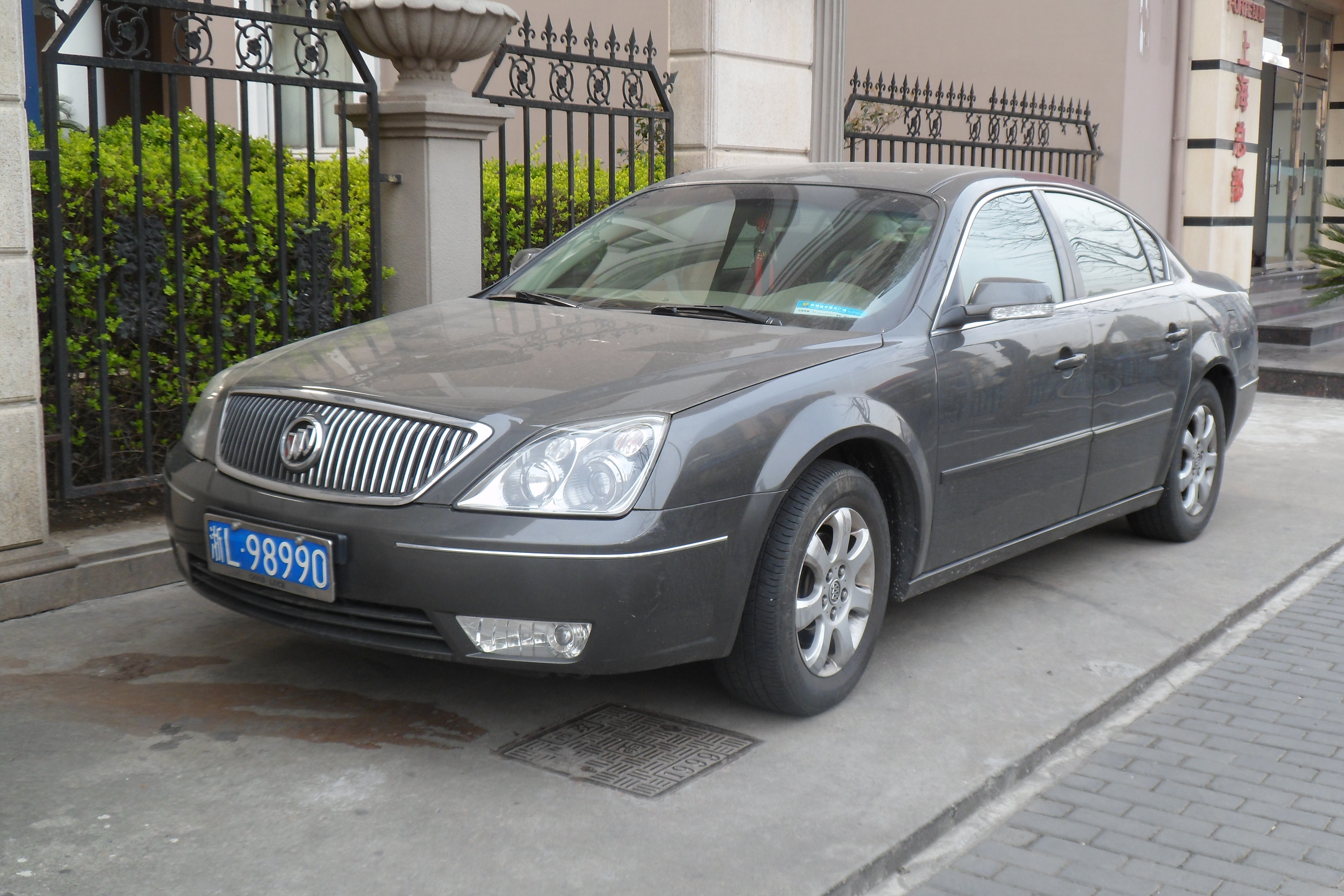
2006–2008 Buick LaCrosse front (China)

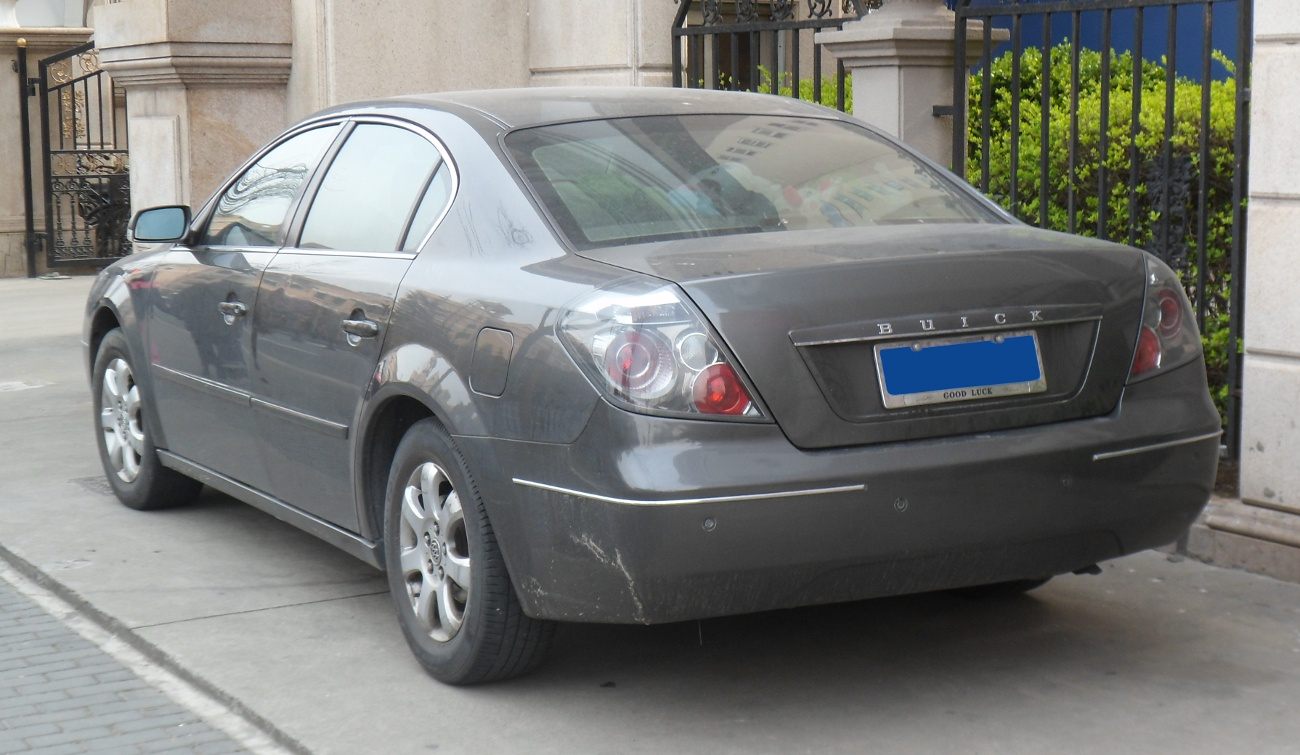
2006–2008 Buick LaCrosse rear (China)

==== Eco-Hybrid ====
In 2008, Shanghai GM introduced a mild hybrid system on the LaCrosse. Using the Belt Alternator Starter system, it is the first hybrid vehicle in the Chinese market as well as the first hybrid in its segment.

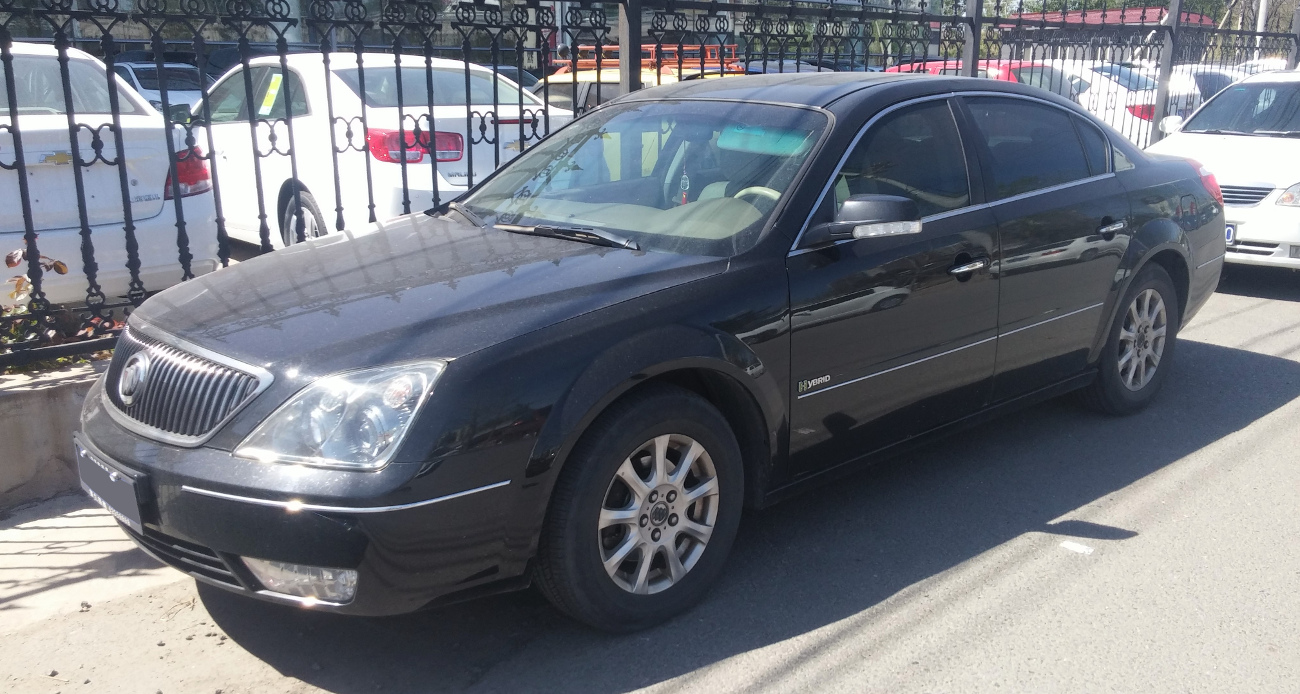
2008 Buick LaCrosse Hybrid front (China)

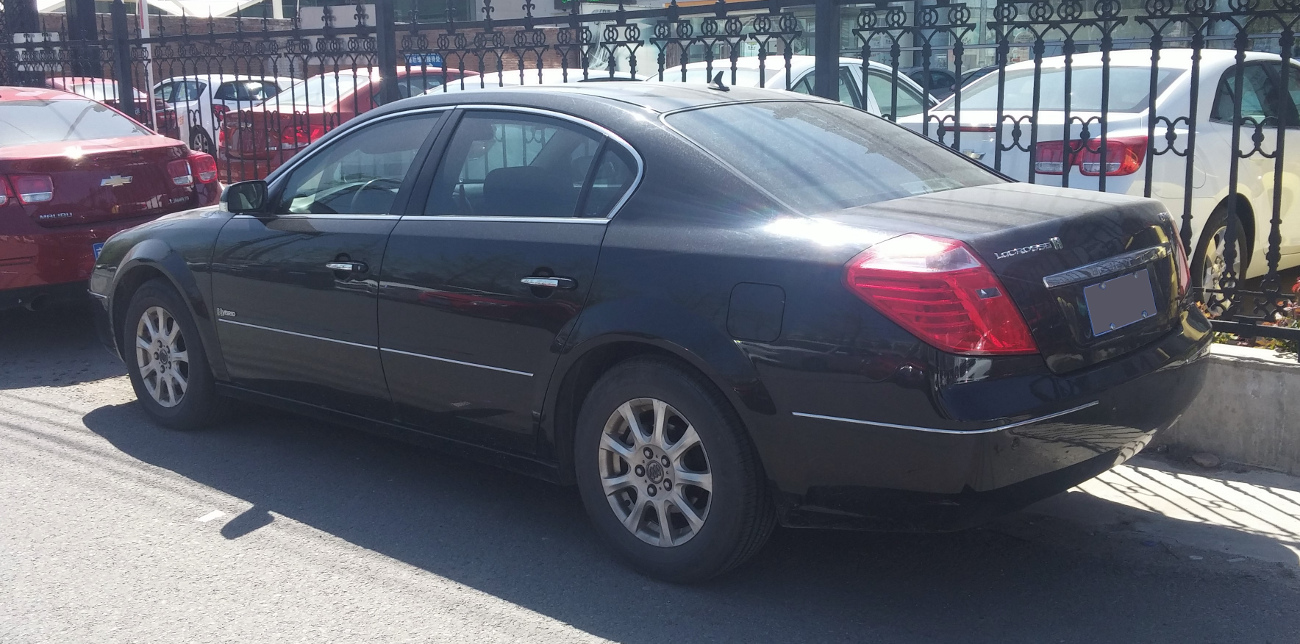
2008 Buick LaCrosse Hybrid rear (China)

== Second generation (2010) ==
Second generation
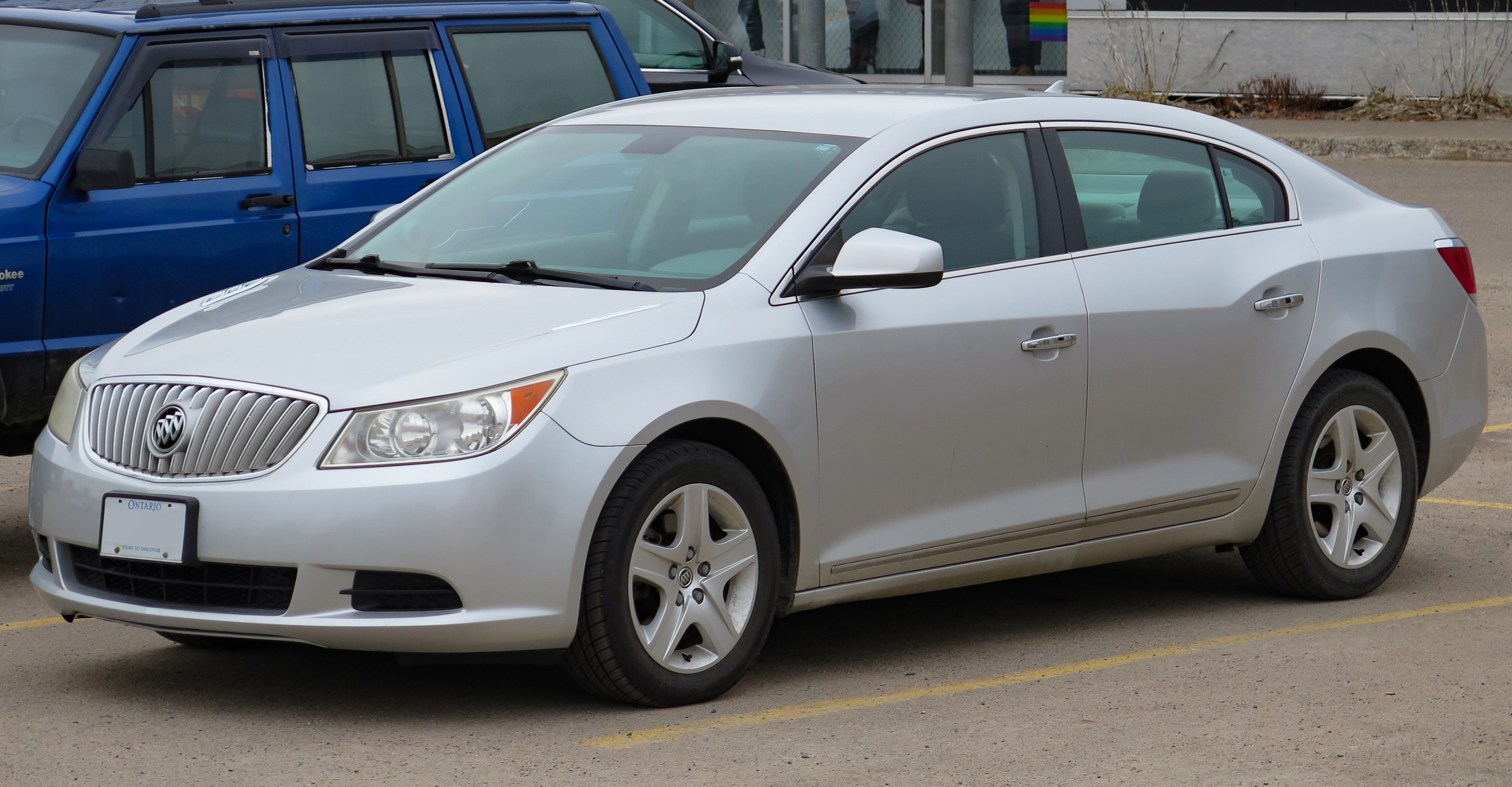

Overview
- Also called: Buick Allure (Canada, 2010 only); Alpheon (South Korea, 2010–2015)
- Production: June 15, 2009–2016
- Model years: 2010–2016
- Assembly: United States: Kansas City, Kansas (Fairfax Assembly); China: Shanghai (SAIC-GM); South Korea: Bupyeong District (GM Korea)
- Designer: Exterior: Michael Pevovar, Manager (2005–2008); Justin Thompson (2007), Richard Duff (2007); James C. Shyr (2010); Designers; Interior: Jeff Nasca, Manager; James C. Shyr (2011)

Body and chassis
- Class: Mid-size
- Layout: Transverse FF / F4 layout
- Platform: GM Epsilon II LWB/GMX353
- Related: Buick Regal; Cadillac XTS; Chevrolet Impala; Opel Insignia; Roewe 950 (China, 2012–2022); Saab 9-5

Powertrain
- Engine: Gasoline: 2.0 L LTG I4 turbo (China); 2.4 L LAF I4; 2.4 L LE5 I4 turbo (China); 2.4 L LUK I4; 3.0 L LF1 V6; 3.6 L LLT V6; 3.6 L LFX V6
- Transmission: 6-speed GM 6T40 automatic; 6-speed GM 6T45 automatic; 6-speed GM 6T70 automatic

Dimensions
- Wheelbase: 111.7 in (2,837 mm)
- Length: 196.9 in (5,001 mm)
- Width: 73.1 in (1,857 mm)
- Height: 59.2 in (1,504 mm)
- Curb weight: 3,765–4,065 lb (1,708–1,844 kg)

Chronology
- Predecessor: Daewoo Veritas (South Korea)
- Successor: Chevrolet Impala (South Korea)

Launched at the 2009 North American International Auto Show in Detroit, Michigan, the second-generation Buick LaCrosse was completely redesigned, becoming Buick's flagship sedan.

The exterior used faux vents and a falling swage line, marketed respectively as VentiPorts and Sweepspears—and making reference to styling elements Buick had incorporated in various forms since introducing them in 1949.

The second-generation used a long-wheelbase (LWB) variant of the Epsilon II platform, shared with the Opel Insignia, 2010–2012 Saab 9-5, and the Cadillac XTS. The design was based on 2008 Buick Invicta concept, and replaces both the Chinese and North American models. The final design work was carried out at the GM design center in Warren, Michigan.

The LaCrosse was marketed in Mexico starting in 2010, as the Buick brand returned to the country after 13 years.

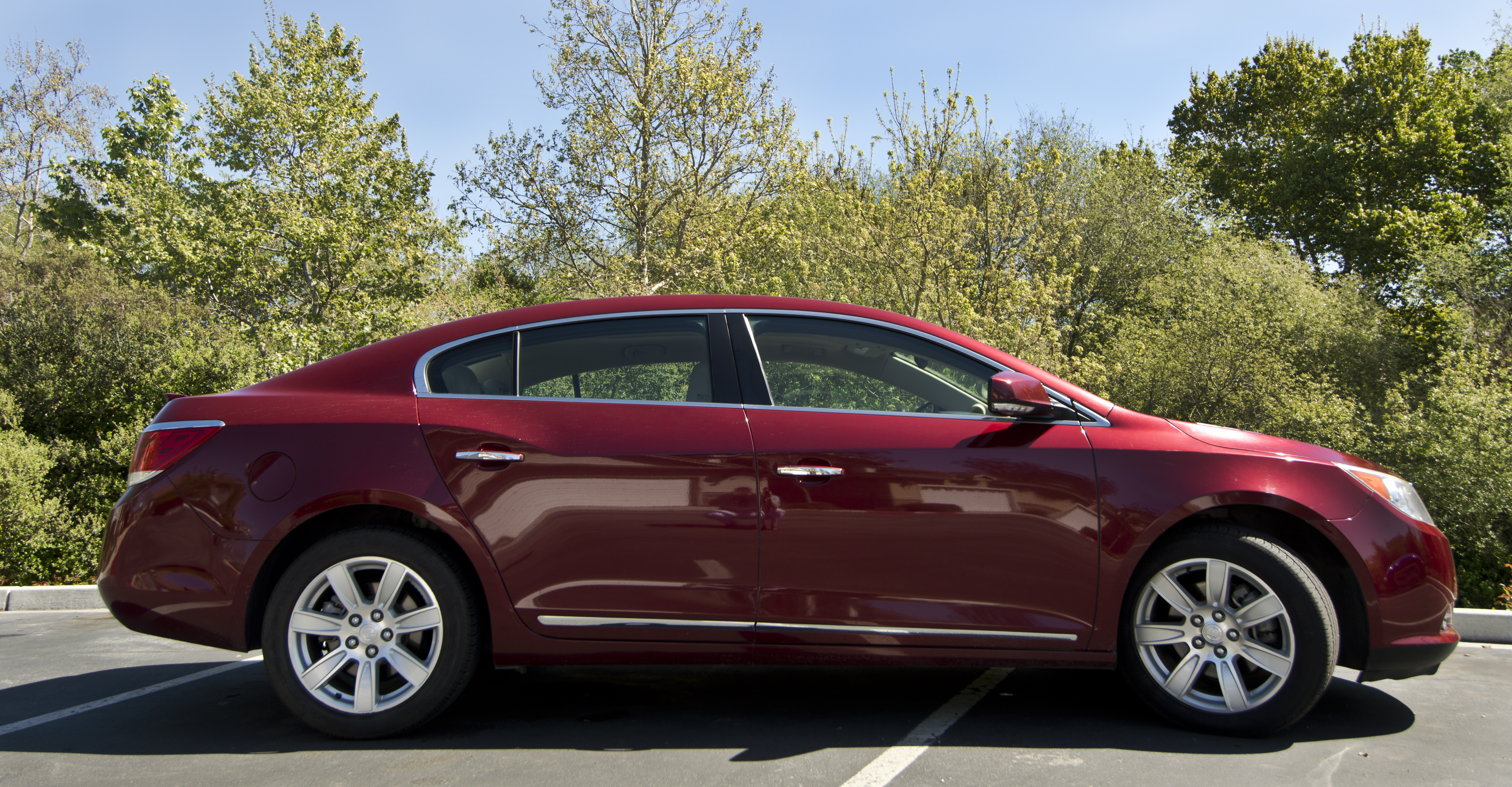
Profile of a 2nd generation Buick LaCrosse, showing Buick's reintroduced, trademark sweep-spear design.

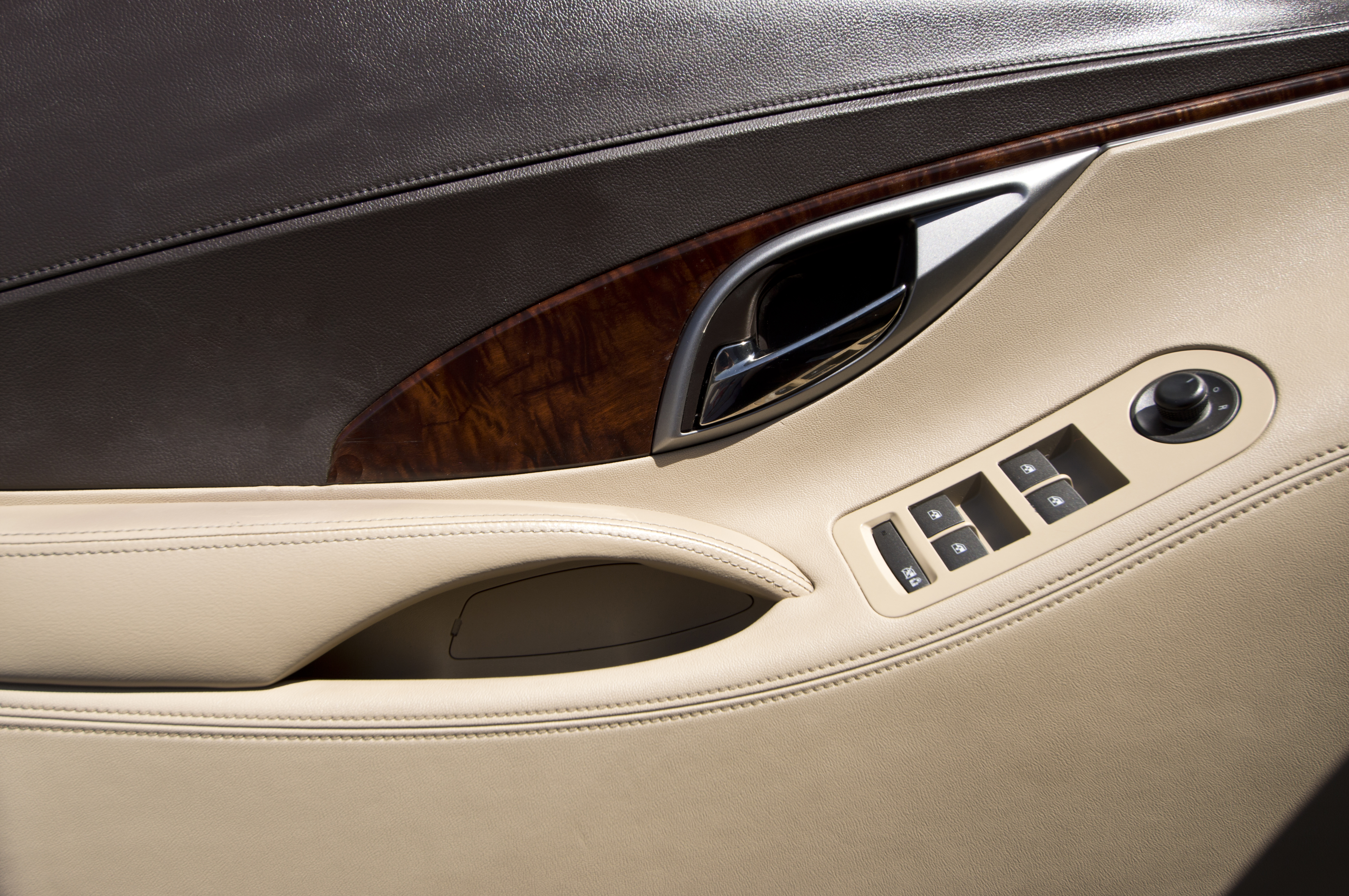
Door panel in 2nd generation Buick LaCrosse with faux leather door cover.

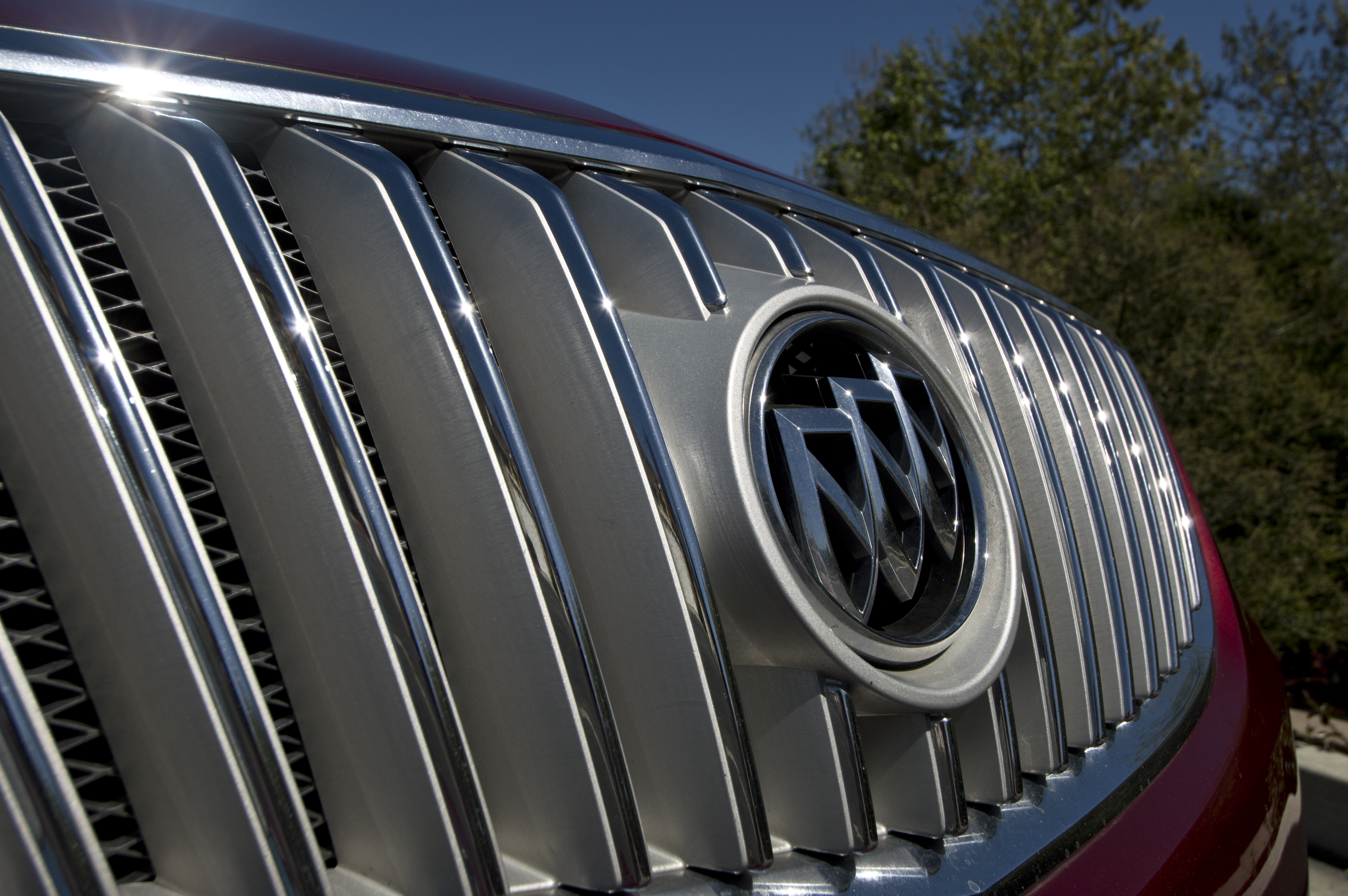
Revised Buick waterfall grille on 2nd generation LaCrosse.

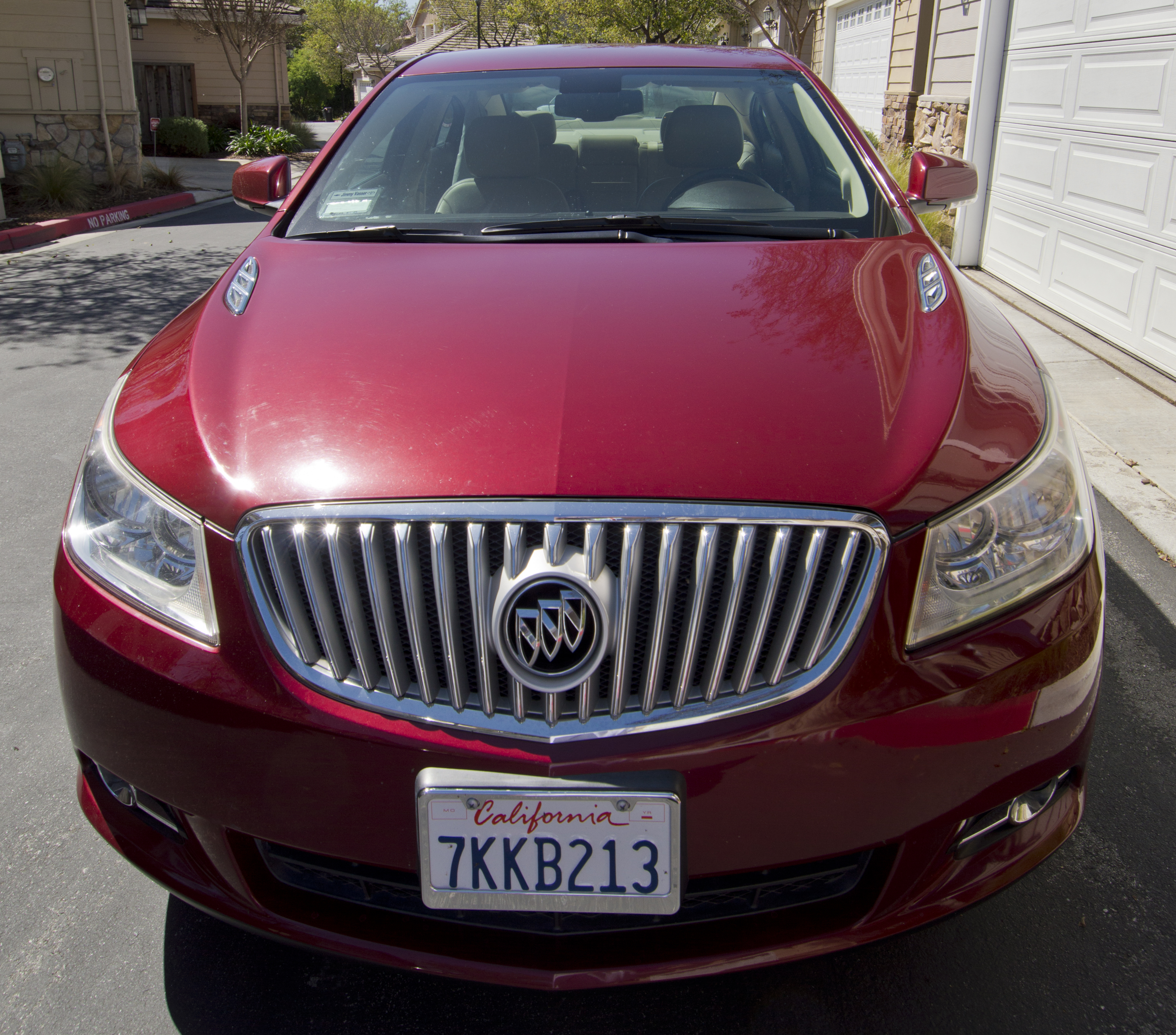
Front of a 2nd generation Buick LaCrosse, showing re-introduced VentiPorts.

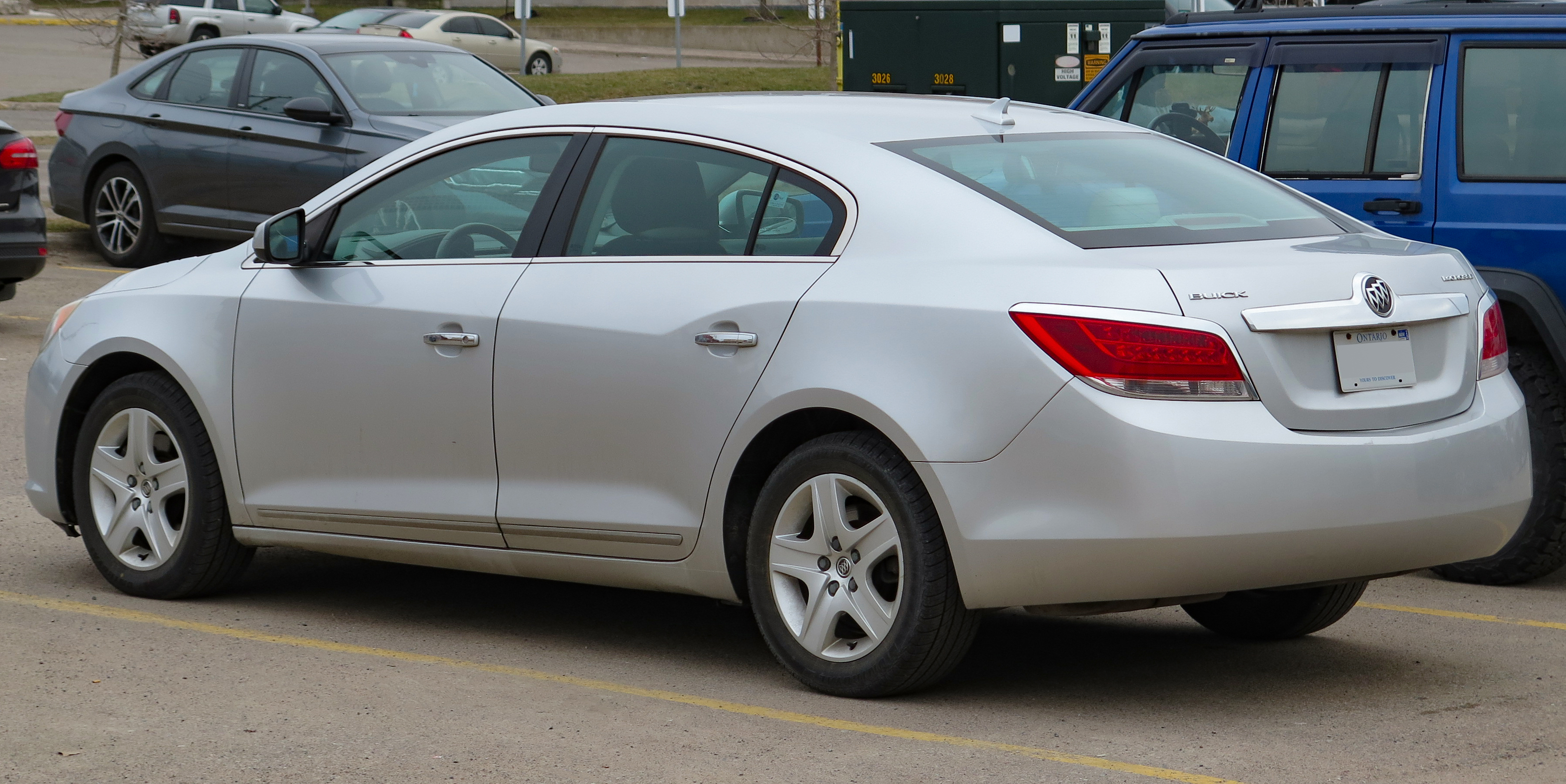
Rear view (pre-facelift)

=== Engines ===
The 2.4L Ecotec four-cylinder replaced the 3.0L V6 as the standard engine on the CX model in the first quarter of 2010. The 3.6L V6 continues to be an option on the CX and front-wheel-drive CXL and standard on the CXS and all-wheel-drive CXL.

Years	Models	Type	Power	Torque
2010	CX	2.4 L Ecotec I4	182 hp (136 kW)	172 lb⋅ft (233 N⋅m)
2010	CX, CXL	3.0 L LF1 V6 (2,994 cc (183 cu in))	255 hp (190 kW) at 6,950 rpm	217 lb⋅ft (294 N⋅m) at 5,600 rpm
2010	CXS	3.6 L LLT V6 (3,564 cc (217 cu in))	280 hp (209 kW) at 6,400 rpm	259 lb⋅ft (351 N⋅m) at 5,200 rpm
2011	CX, CXL (FWD)	2.4 L Ecotec I4	182 hp (136 kW)	172 lb⋅ft (233 N⋅m)
2011	CXL, CXS	3.6 L LLT V6 (3,564 cc (217 cu in))	280 hp (209 kW) at 6,400 rpm	259 lb⋅ft (351 N⋅m) at 5,200 rpm
2012–2016	FWD (Base–Premium 1)	2.4 L Ecotec I4 with eAssist	182 hp (136 kW)	172 lb⋅ft (233 N⋅m)
2012–2016	FWD (except Base), AWD	3.6 L LFX V6 (3,564 cc (217 cu in))	303 hp (226 kW) at 6,800 rpm	264 lb⋅ft (358 N⋅m) at 5,300 rpm

All V6 models are equipped with the Hydra-Matic 6T70 6-speed automatic transmission.

=== Reception ===
The New York Times said the new LaCrosse combined design elements from classic American cars of the 1930s and 1950s with traditional Chinese aesthetic elements: U.S. News & World Report aggregated the following ratings based on numerous reviews of the models years, also for the 2016 model year. Results of the analysis were given on a scale of 1 to 10, where a higher number indicates positive reception. The overall result for the 2016 model year was 8.7, critics' rating 8.8, performance 8.1, interior 8.4, and safety 9.7.

Year	Overall	Critics' Rating	Performance	Interior	Cost to Own	Safety	Pros	Cons
2010	8.4	9.1	8.5	9.1	8.9	9.4	Luxurious interior; Strong acceleration, even with base engine; Great safety ratings	Small trunk
2011	9.0	8.7	8.4	9.0	9.1	9.7	Luxurious interior rivals a Lexus; Excellent safety ratings	Small trunk
2012	8.8	8.4	8.2	8.5	9.0	9.7	Good fuel economy with eAssist; Powerful available V6; First-rate, attractive cabin	Small trunk; Poor rearward visibility
2013	8.9	8.8	8.2	8.2	8.9	9.7	eAssist model's great fuel economy; Comfortable ride; Handsome, well-built cabin	Small trunk
2014	8.6	8.8	8.0	8.3	8.7	9.7	Luxurious interior; Comfortable, quiet ride; Good fuel economy in eAssist model	Small trunk
2015	8.6	8.7	8.1	8.4	N/A	9.7	Upscale, quiet cabin; LaCrosse eAssist's excellent fuel economy; Comfortable, refined ride	Limited trunk room; Numb steering; LaCrosse eAssist's poor acceleration
2016	8.7	8.8	8.1	8.4	N/A	9.7	Excellent infotainment system; Spacious, quiet interior; LaCrosse eAssist's good fuel economy; Comfortable, controlled ride	Small trunk; Underpowered eAssist engine

=== Technology and features ===
The 2010 Buick LaCrosse CXS was the first North American car to incorporate a front suspension design, marketed as HiPer Strut, designed to improve ride and handling while reducing torque steer. The Buick LaCrosse CXS included a system marketed as Real Time Damping that adjusts the damping forces of the shocks and struts for improved ride and handling.

The 2010, 2012, and 2013 models lacked an interior trunk release mechanism. The trunk was only accessible using the key fob (remote keyless entry) or a touch sensor between the trunk lid and the license plate. The 2011 model added a remote release button at the left of the steering wheel on the instrument panel. The 2014 model refresh returned the trunk release button to LaCrosse but placed it on the driver door.

==== eAssist ====
The 2012 LaCrosse features a new mild hybrid as its base model. Dubbed eAssist, the 2012 LaCrosse introduced GM's second-generation belted-alternator starter system. The non-hybrid 4-cylinder was no longer offered. The system consists of a 115-volt lithium-ion battery pack, a 15 kW electric motor capable of adding 15 horsepower of assist while accelerating, and the next-generation 6T40 GM Hydra-Matic transmission with reduced friction components over the previous generation. The eAssist LaCrosse delivers a class leading fuel economy of 25 mpg city and 36 mpg highway. In addition to providing additional power to the 182 hp 2.4L 4-cylinder, the BAS-II system allows for engine start/stop operation when the vehicle is not moving and allows for complete fuel cutoff to the engine during deceleration.

=== Canadian market: Allure ===
The second-generation LaCrosse debuted to the Canadian market at the 2009 Montreal International Auto Show as the Buick Allure, and soon after production began, General Motors Canada renamed the Allure to LaCrosse, to correspond with the car's global marketing. GM Canada has offered existing Allure owners the option to change nameplates to LaCrosse.

=== Korean market: Alpheon ===
The Alpheon was a localized version of the Buick LaCrosse for the South Korean market. Alpheon was a standalone brand from GM Korea. The cars were additionally fitted with amenities such as controls in the rear armrest, mood lights and more. A version of the vehicle (with 3.0L V6 engine mated to a six-speed automatic transmission) was unveiled at the 2010 Busan International Motor Show.

Production began on August 9, 2010, at GM Daewoo's factory in Bupyeong, Incheon. Market launch began in September 2010. Early models included one with a 3.0-liter engine (from the 2010 Buick LaCrosse) in mid-September, followed by two models each with a 2.4-liter engine in October.

The Alpheon was discontinued in 2015, after monthly sales fell below 500 cars. GM Korea replaced it with the Chevrolet Impala.

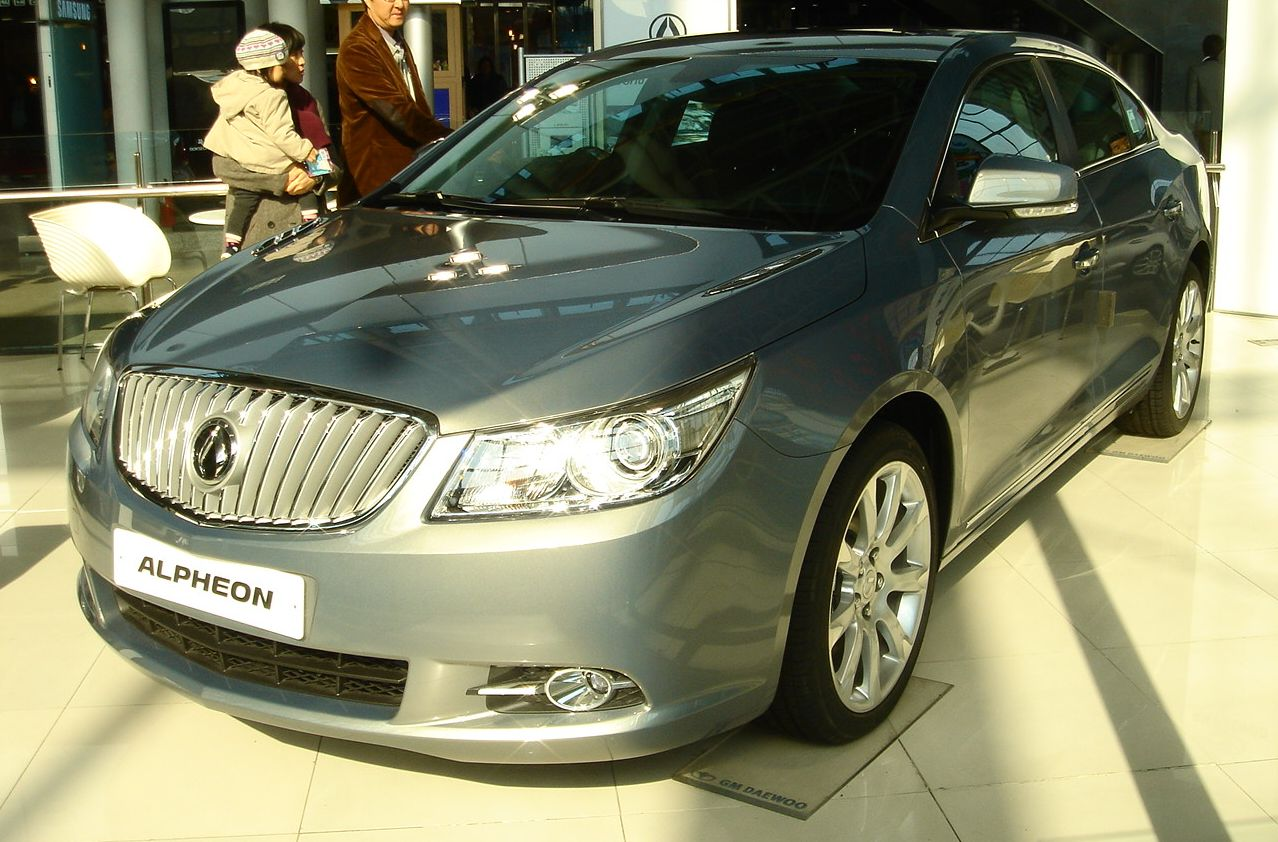
2010 Alpheon sedan

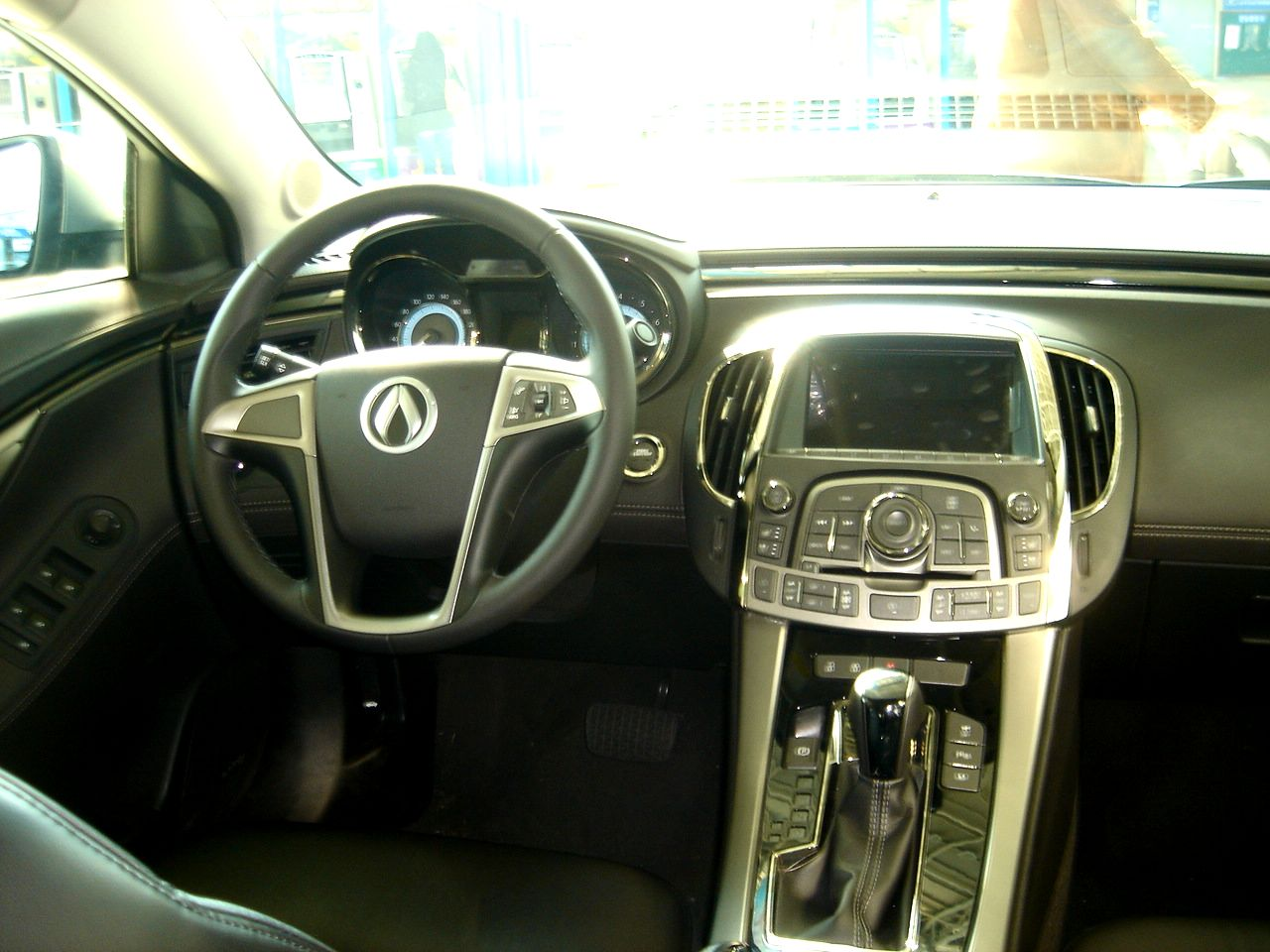
2010 Alpheon sedan interior

=== Chinese market: Roewe 950 ===
The Roewe 950 was a licensed restyled Chinese version of the Buick LaCrosse produced by Roewe of SAIC. It was sold alongside the Buick LaCrosse in China, and had a price range similar to that of the LaCrosse. The sheet metal, while similar in appearance, was unique to the Roewe.

In late February 2012, the Chinese government removed the Buick LaCrosse (along with all other foreign vehicles) from the list of vehicles approved for government procurement. Though popular among government officials, the LaCrosse also thrived via private purchases.

=== 2014 facelift ===
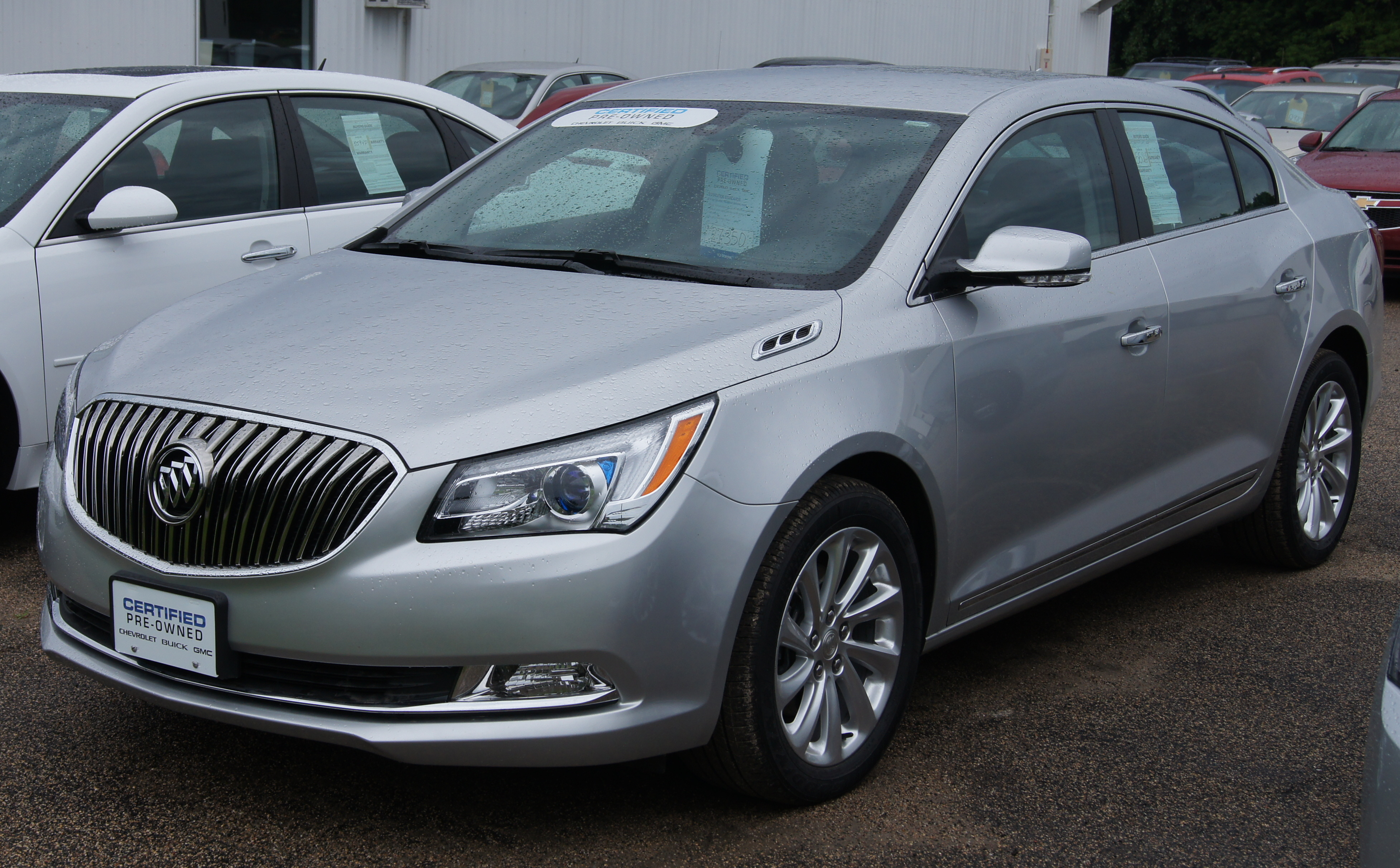
Buick LaCrosse front (2014 facelift)

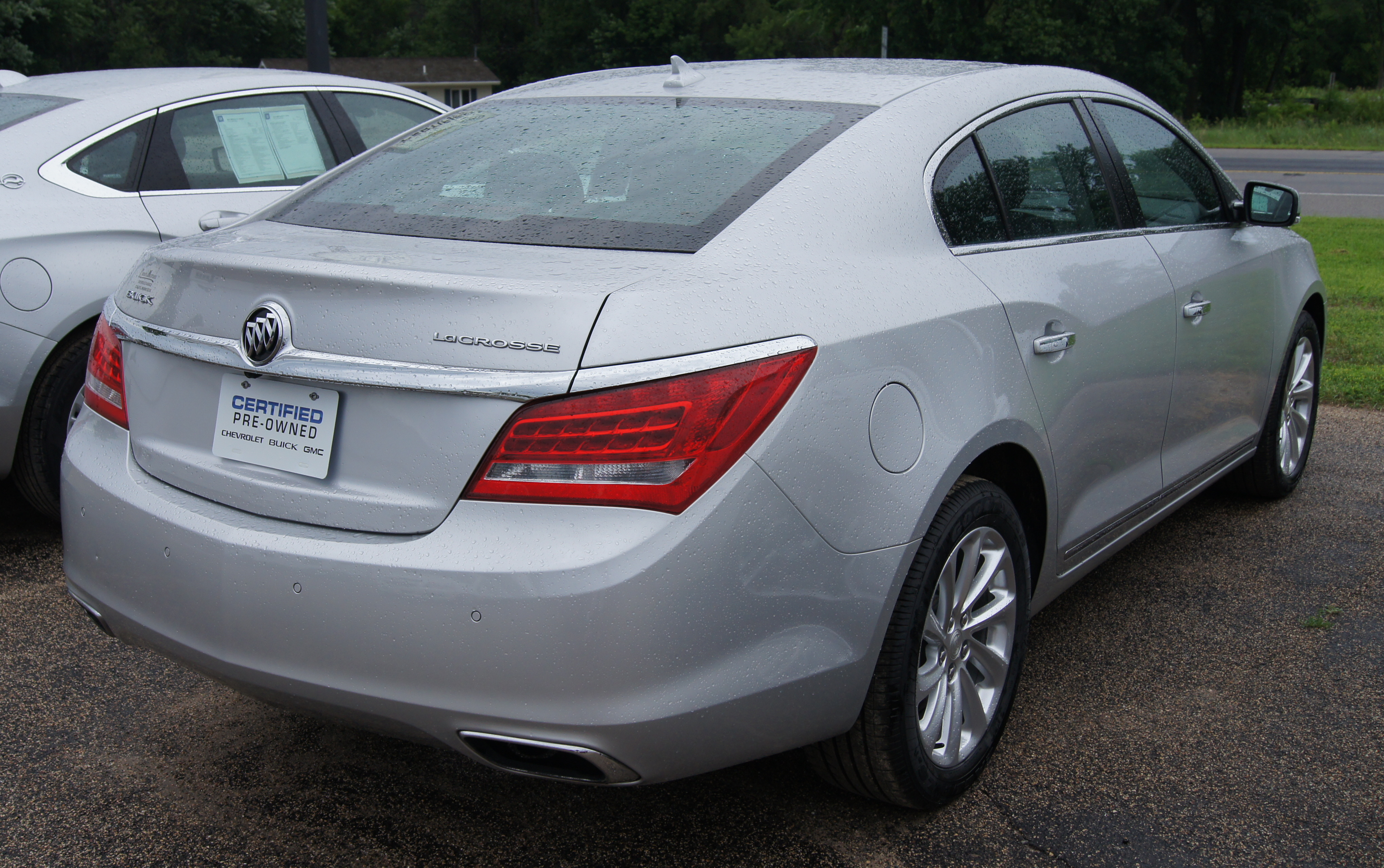
Buick LaCrosse rear (2014 facelift)

Buick unveiled a revised 2014 LaCrosse at the 2013 New York Auto Show. Redesigned front and rear fascias, new wheel designs, a reconfigurable eight-inch TFT LCD instrument cluster, semi-aniline leather seating, and radar- and camera-based safety features such as forward collision alert and side blind zone alert are among the most notable changes for this mid-cycle refresh.

For 2016, the LaCrosse added a new Sport Touring Edition which included unique 18" aluminum black pocket wheels, and a rear lip spoiler.

=== Production ===
Production of North American models moved from Oshawa to the Fairfax Assembly plant in Kansas City, Kansas, where it ran down the same production line as the Chevrolet Malibu. Delivery of 2010 models was delayed a few weeks in order to assure quality control. Production for China started a month later.

=== Safety ===
The 2010 model year LaCrosse was awarded "Top Safety Pick" by IIHS, as it received a Good rating in the crash test evaluations particularly in the roof strength test which it could withstand force of four times its vehicle weight.

IIHS scores (2010)
Moderate overlap front (original test)	Good
Side (original test)	Good
Roof strength	Good
Head restraints and seats	Good

== Third generation (2017) ==
Third generation
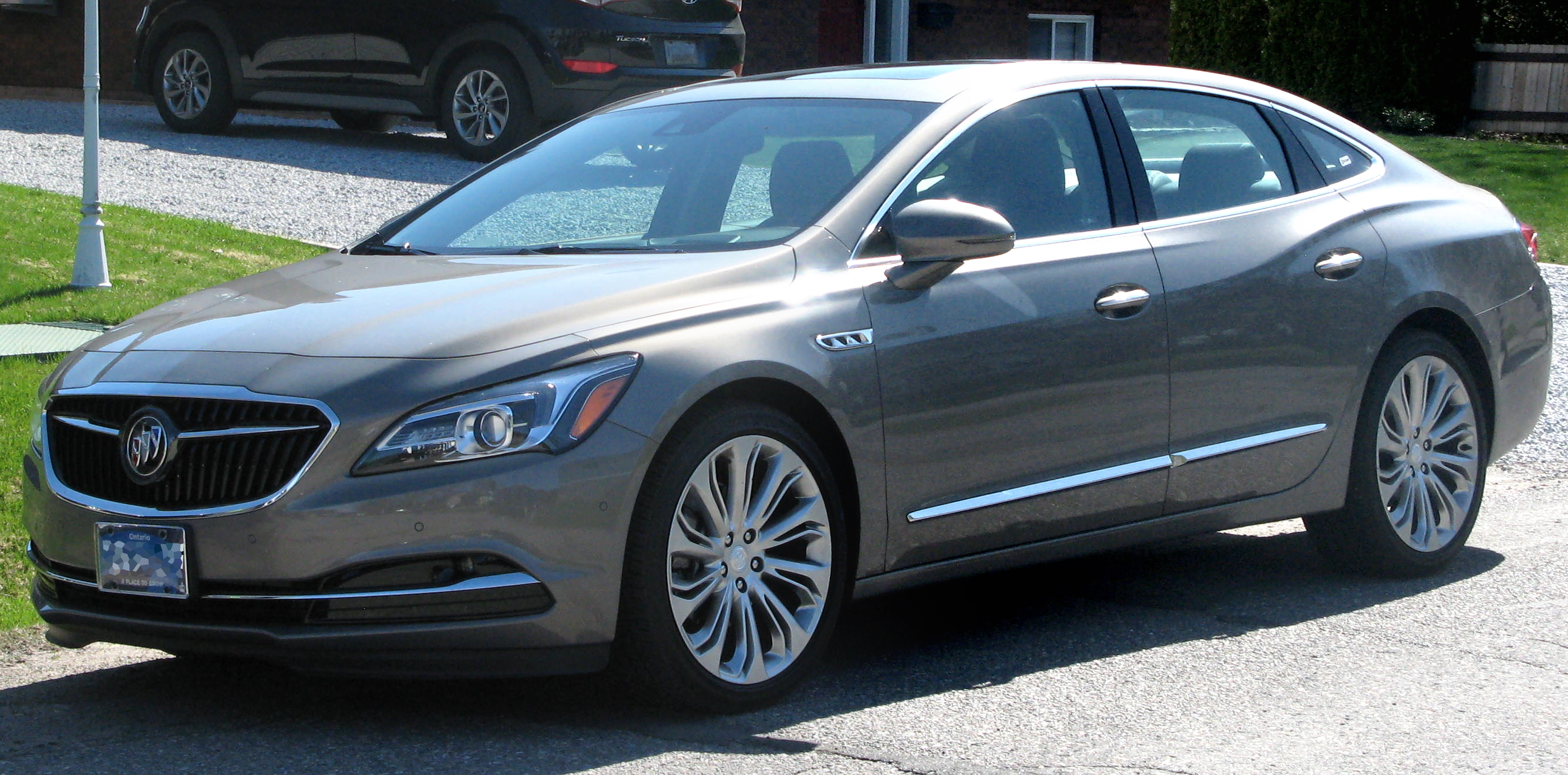
- 2018 Buick LaCrosse Premium

Overview
- Production: 2017–2023 (China); 2016–2019 (North America)
- Model years: 2017–2023 (China); 2017–2019 (North America)
- Assembly: United States: Detroit, Michigan (Detroit/Hamtramck Assembly); China: Shanghai (SAIC-GM)
- Designer: Holt Ware; Elizabeth Wetzel (interior)

Body and chassis
- Layout: FF / F4
- Platform: P2XX platform
- Related: Buick Regal; Opel Insignia

Powertrain
- Engine: North America: 2.5 L LHN I4 (hybrid); 3.6 L LGX DI V6; China: 1.3 L L3T I3 turbo; 1.5 L LFV I4 turbo (20T, 2016–18); 1.5 L LAX I4 turbo (552T, 2021–23); 1.8 L LKN I4 (hybrid) (30H, 2016–18); 2.0 L LTG I4 turbo (28T, 2016–19); 2.0 L LSY I4 turbo (652T, 2020–23)
- Electric motor: 20 kW HP5 (eAssist); 54 kW PMSM (30H)
- Transmission: North America: 6-speed 6T40 MNH automatic; 8-speed Aisin AF50-8 automatic (2017); 9-speed 9T60 (M3G) automatic (2018–19); China: CVT (2016–18, 2020–23); 7-speed dual clutch (2016–18); 9-speed 9T50 Hydramatic automatic (2016–)
- Hybrid drivetrain: eAssist MHEV (2.5L); FHEV (30H)
- Battery: 0.5-kWh lithium-ion battery pack (eAssist); 1.5-kWh lithium-ion battery (30H)

Dimensions
- Wheelbase: 114.4 in (2,905 mm)
- Length: 197.5 in (5,017 mm); 197.9 in (5,026 mm) (2019 facelift)
- Width: 73.5 in (1,866 mm)
- Height: 57.5 in (1,460 mm); 57.6 in (1,462 mm) (2019 facelift)
- Curb weight: 3,329–3,560 lb (1,510–1,615 kg) (I4 Powertrain)

The third-generation LaCrosse debuted at the 2015 LA Auto Show as a 2017 model using the E2XX platform shared with the 2016–2020 Chevrolet Impala. The platform switch and use of high-strength steels reduced weight by about 300 pounds (140 kg), despite slightly growing in length and width.

The car was powered by a 1.5-liter GM Small Gasoline Engine and 2.0-liter GM Ecotec engine in China for tax credit purposes and by a 3.6-liter fourth-generation GM High Feature engine in North America. Since 2018, the LaCrosse came standard with an eAssist drivetrain, consisting of a mild hybrid 20-kilowatt (27 hp) electric and 2.5-liter Ecotec gasoline engine sending power to the front wheels through a 6-speed automatic transmission.

In order to make room for an upcoming new product in the Kansas City facility, the production of the LaCrosse was moved from GM Fairfax Assembly to Detroit/Hamtramck Assembly.

The main difference between the North American and Chinese model LaCrosse was the drive system. Models sold in the Chinese market were front-wheel drive vehicles only, compared to their American counterparts which were available in front-wheel drive or all-wheel drive.

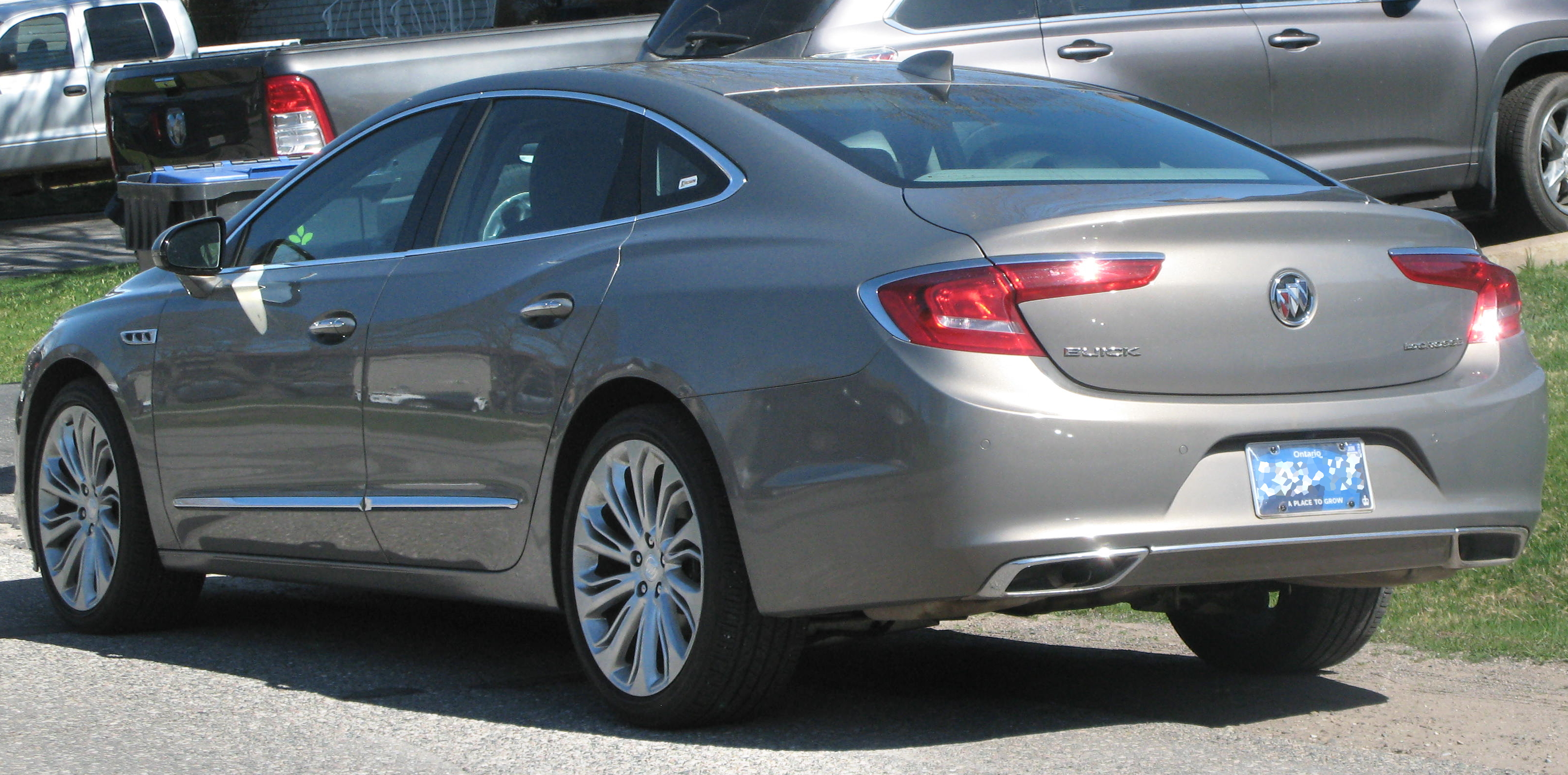
Rear view

Third-generation features included:

- Automatic parking assist (front ultrasonic parking assist is now present)
- Apple CarPlay and Android Auto for the Buick IntelliLink infotainment system
- An all-new 3.6-liter direct-injection VVT V6 engine (LGX 310 hp (231 kW; 314 PS)/282 lb⋅ft (382 N⋅m)), with stop-start and cylinder deactivation.
- Aisin (AWF8F35) automatic transmission (2017 only)
- From 2018, an all-new 9-speed GM 9T60 (M3G) automatic transmission with the optional V6

=== Safety ===
The 2017 LaCrosse received a Top Safety Pick in the Insurance Institute for Highway Safety's Crashworthiness test and a Poor rating for headlights, which prevented a Top Safety Pick Plus. The LaCrosse came standard with ten airbags: front air bags, roof rail–mounted head-curtain air bags, seat-mounted side-impact air bags for both front and rear outboard seat passengers, and knee air bags for front seat passengers. Additional standard safety features included ultrasonic rear parking sensors and a backup camera. Optional safety features included a following distance indicator, forward collision alert, forward collision braking, front pedestrian detection, blind spot detection, lane keeping assist, and rear-cross traffic alert.

IIHS scores (2017)
Small overlap front (driver)	Good	
Moderate overlap front (original test)	Good	
Side (original test)	Good	
Roof strength	Good	
Head restraints and seats	Good	
Headlights	Poor	
Front crash prevention: vehicle-to-pedestrian	Superior	Basic
Child seat anchors (LATCH) ease of use	Marginal	

=== Reception ===
Car and Driver's said the LaCrosse had an "elegant exterior, much-improved interior materials, impressive ride and handling with up level suspension," while U.S. News & World Report listed the 2017 LaCrosse as a Finalist for Best Large Car for Families. Motor Trend said "the car drops about 300 pounds and rides on a new platform, which contributes to a better driving experience and a much quieter ride. Buick also separates the LaCrosse from most competitors by offering all-wheel drive on the highest trim level," and listed the Kia Cadenza, Nissan Maxima, Chrysler 300, and Lexus ES as competitors.

Consumer Reports was critical of the gear selector, saying "our biggest gripe about the controls is the new electronic gear selector. Drivers used to a traditional PRNDL configuration—in other words, those drivers who kept the lights on for Buick for many years—will be puzzled, if not angered." In addition, reviewers were critical of the sticker price on top-trim, heavily optioned models with Bloomberg saying "by the time you spend the $48,395 it costs to get the LaCrosse to this level, you're creeping into Audi/BMW/Mercedes territory."

=== Discontinuation ===
The Buick LaCrosse was one of six vehicles GM discontinued after the 2019 model year amid a global restructuring effort. The discontinuation of the LaCrosse affected the North American market and Buick will continue to manufacture the LaCrosse in China, where the sedan remains a best seller. Production of the Buick LaCrosse for North America ceased on February 15, 2019.

=== 2019 facelift ===
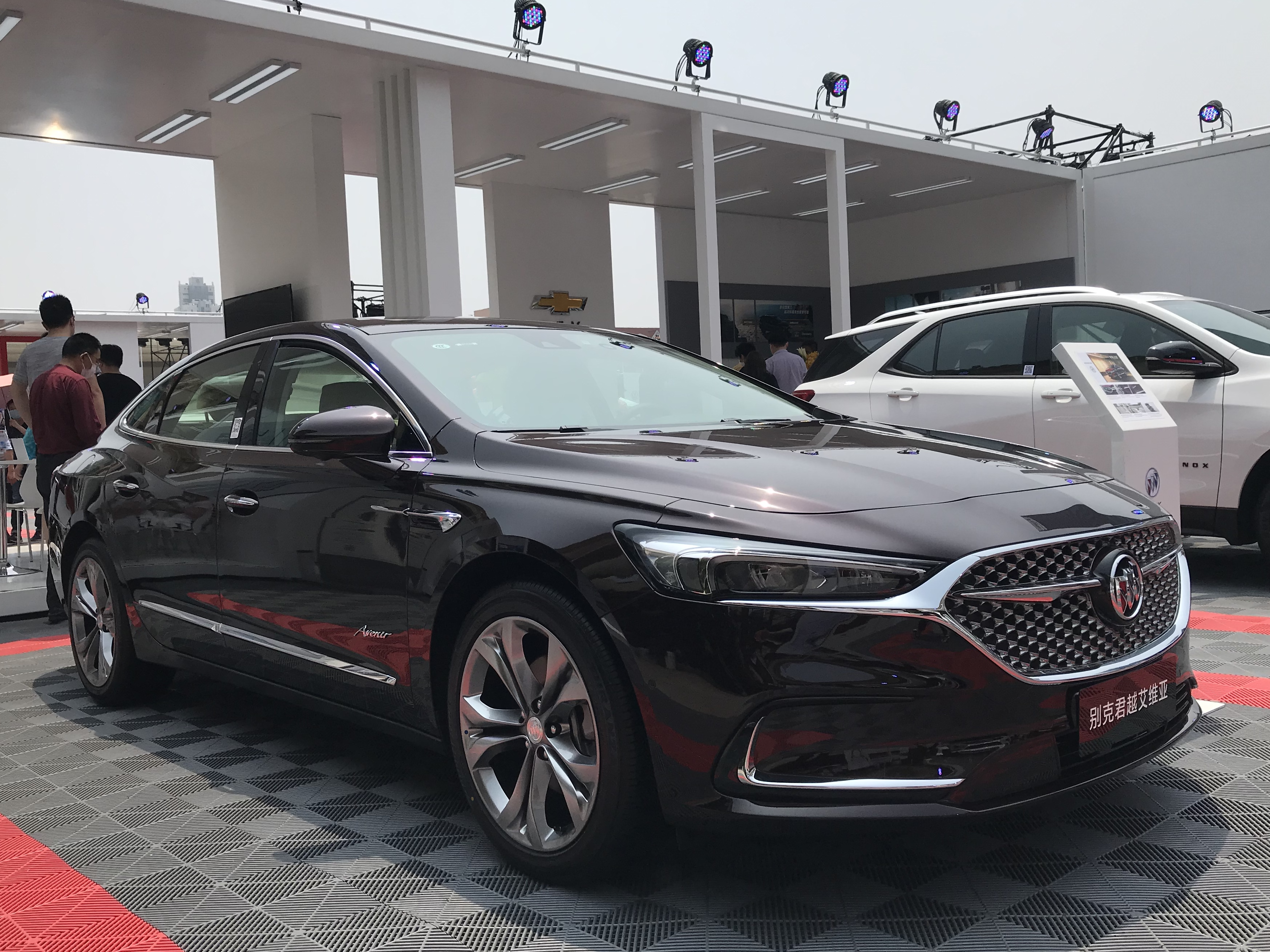

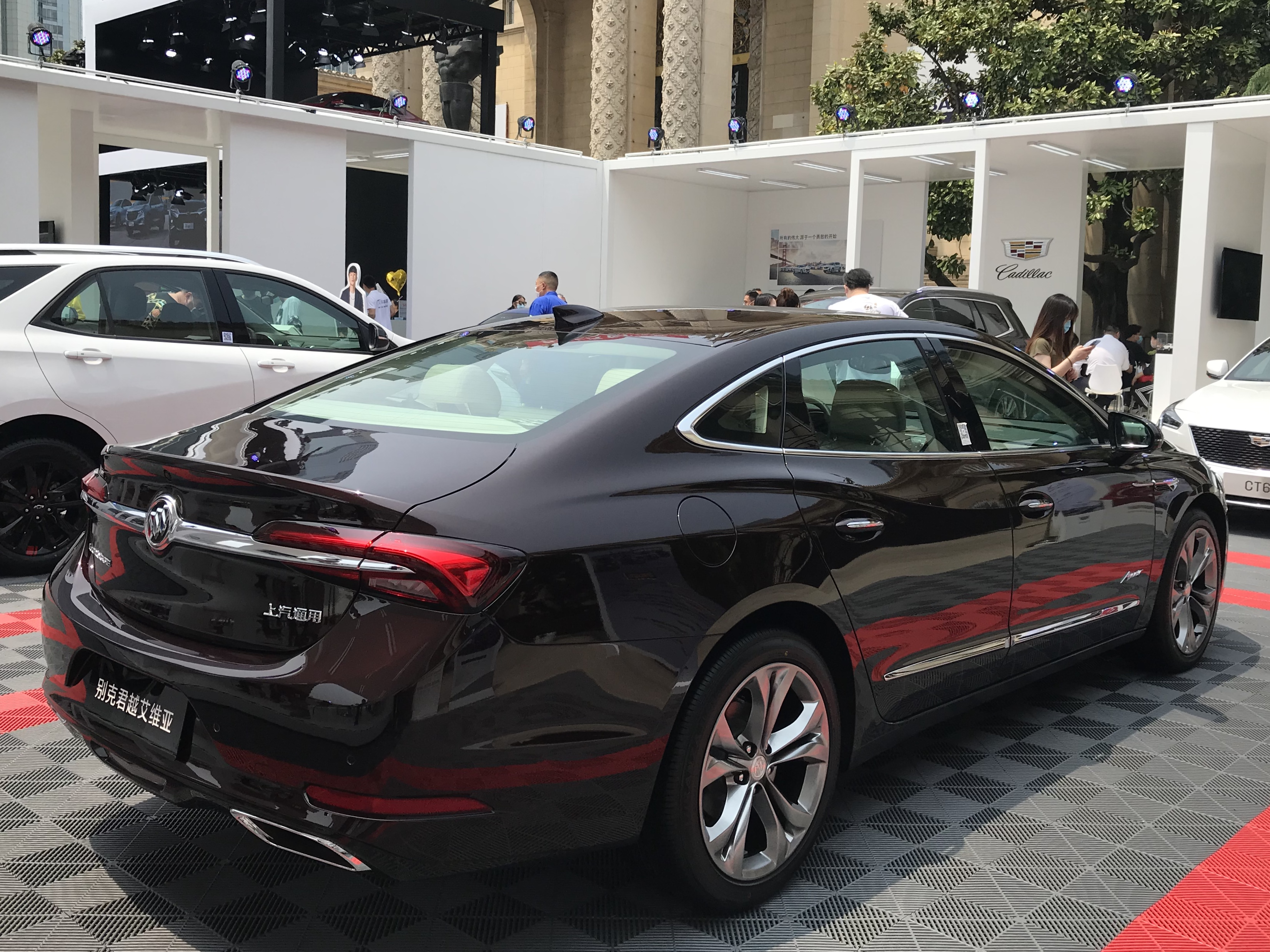
2019 Buick LaCrosse facelift (China)

A facelift was introduced for the 2019 model year in the Chinese market, with the facelifted LaCrosse featuring a new 2.0-liter turbo engine to the powertrain options. The new 2.0-liter turbo engine is one of GM's eighth-generation Ecotec engines and delivers a maximum output of 237 hp (177 kW; 240 PS) and 350 N⋅m (258 lb⋅ft) of torque. The 2019 LaCrosse was available with a nine-speed Hydra-Matic automatic transmission with an average fuel consumption of 6.9 L/100 km (34 mpg_{‑US}). Trim levels for the New LaCrosse model are known as the 652T Elite, 652T Luxury and 652T Distinguished. From 2021 to 2023, the 552T trim level was available where a 1.5-liter turbocharged engine was also introduced as standard.

== Fourth generation (2023) ==
Fourth generation
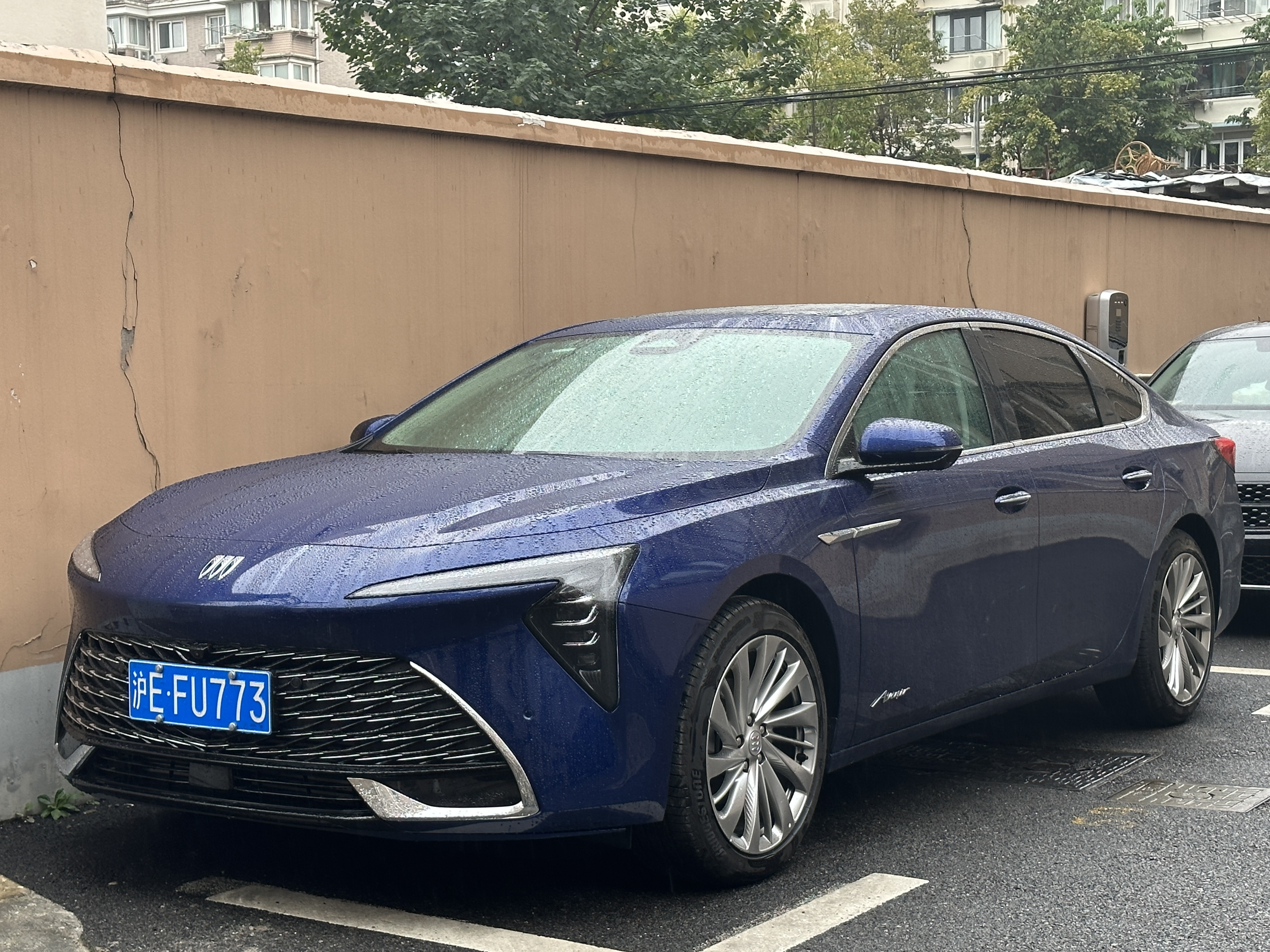
- 2023 Buick LaCrosse Avenir

Overview
- Production: 2023–present
- Assembly: China: Shanghai (SAIC-GM)

Body and chassis
- Layout: FF
- Platform: VSS-F platform (P2XX-2)

Powertrain
- Engine: 1.5 L LAX I4 turbo; 2.0 L LXH I4 turbo
- Transmission: 9-speed 9T50 Hydramatic automatic

Dimensions
- Wheelbase: 2,905 mm (114.4 in)
- Length: 4,996 mm (196.7 in)
- Width: 1,866 mm (73.5 in)
- Height: 1,469–1,472 mm (57.8–58.0 in)
- Curb weight: 1,560–1,609 kg (3,439–3,547 lb)

In 2023, Buick unveiled the fourth-generation LaCrosse, adopting Buick's new Pure Design philosophy first seen on the Buick Century minivan, as well as Buick's new corporate emblem. The fourth-generation LaCrosse is available in four trims: Beyond, Enjoy, Premium, and Avenir. The LaCrosse was only offered with a turbo 2.0-liter four-cylinder engine at launch; a 1.5-liter four-cylinder for the base model will be available later in 2023.

This generation Lacrosse is the first of its kind to have the gear selector in the style of a column shifter compared to previous generations which used the floor shifter based gear selector.

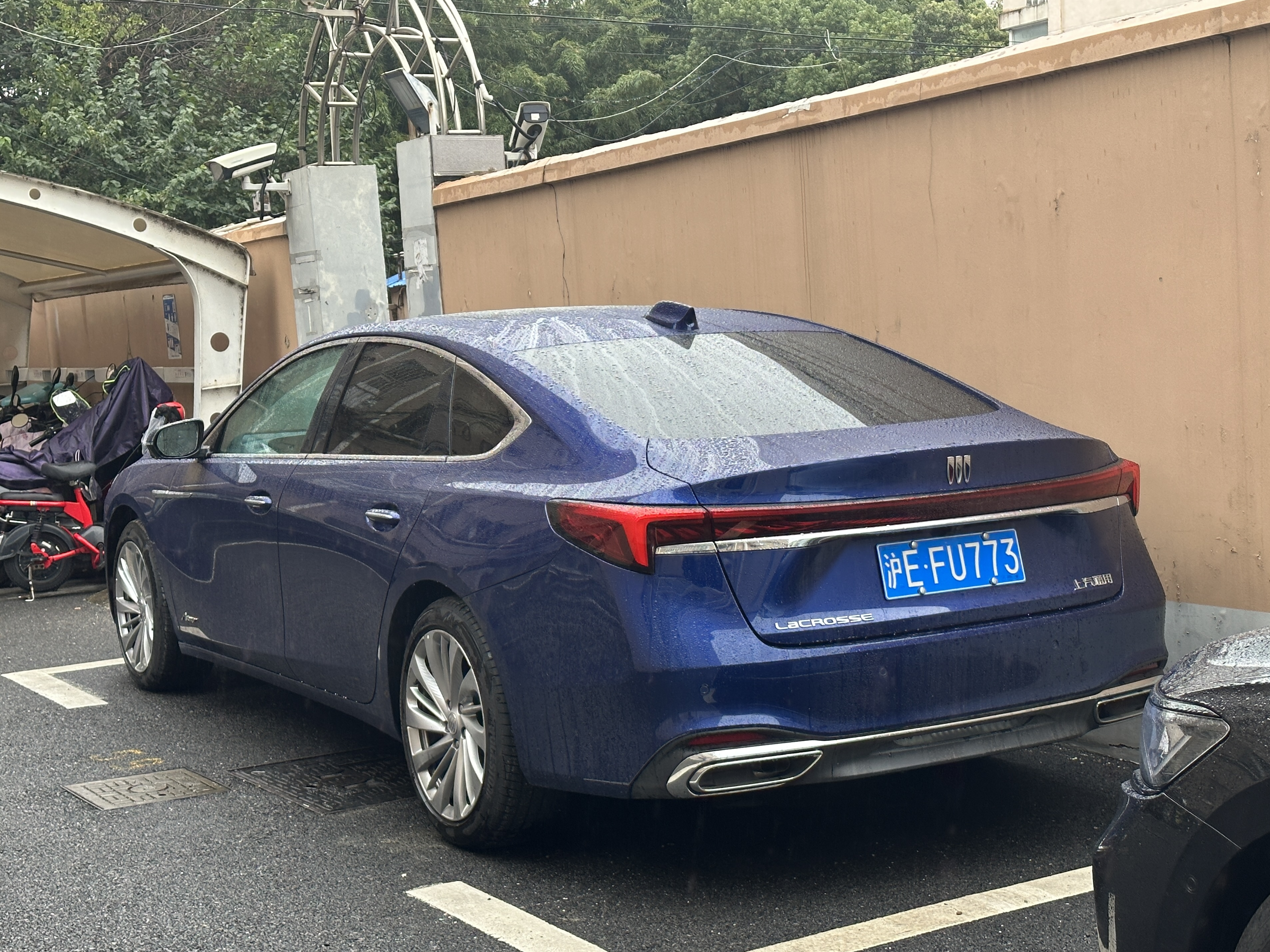
Rear view

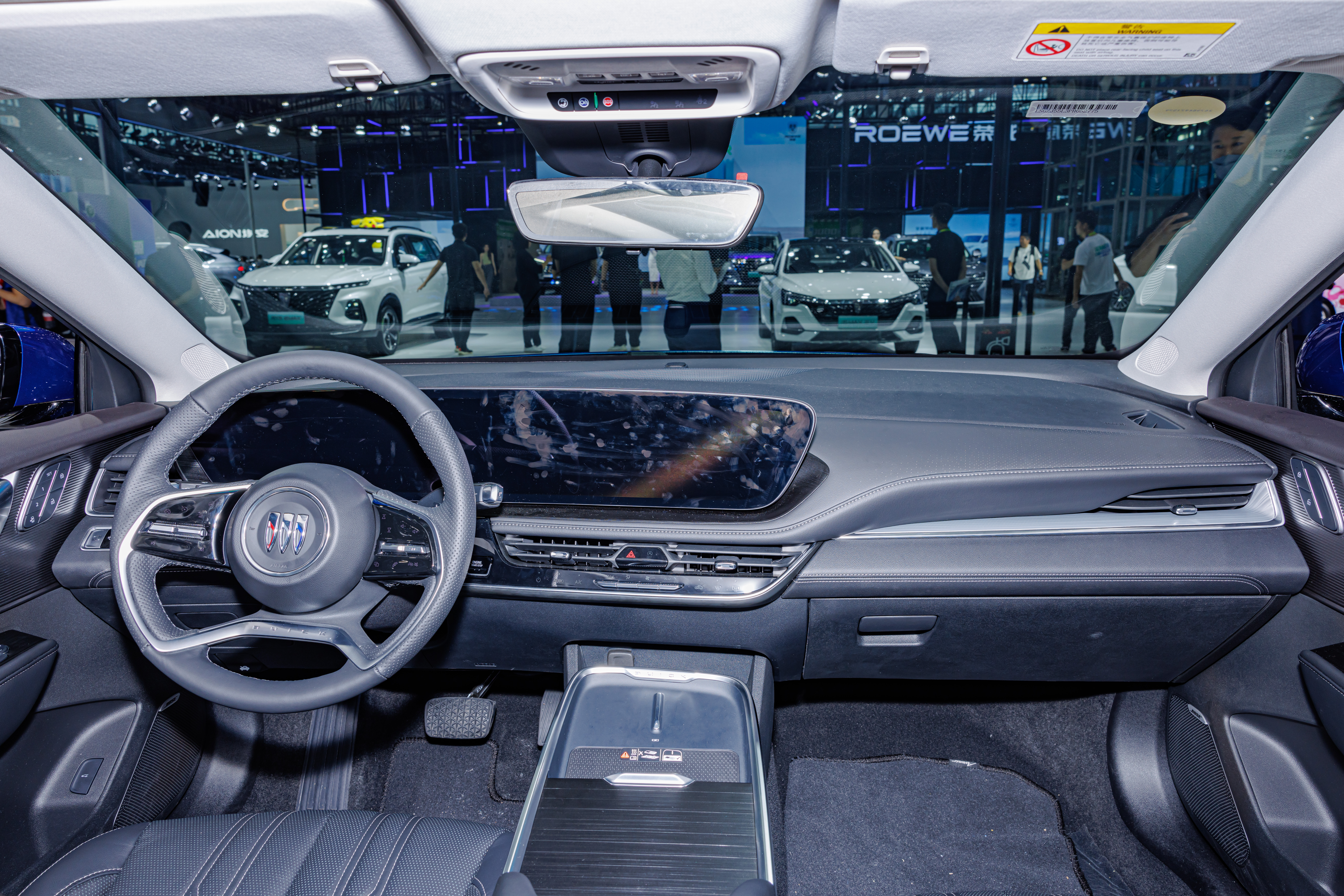
Interior

== Annual sales ==
Calendar year	United States	Canada	China
2004	10,995		—
2005	94,631		—
2006	71,072		52,021
2007	47,747		71,500
2008	36,873		32,892
2009	27,818		43,429
2010	61,178		104,378
2011	58,474		103,366
2012	57,076		86,101
2013	48,798		89,279
2014	51,468	1,557	83,858
2015	42,035	990	85,005
2016	27,582	785	80,966
2017	20,161	921	99,609
2018	15,527	679	69,709
2019	7,241	389	39,937
2020	230	127	54,975
2021	10	8	49,875
2022	—	—	32,082
2023	—	—	31,166
2024	—	—	22,909
2025	—	—	57,829
Total	664,916	5,456	1,290,866
