= SangYup Lee =

South Korean automobile designer

- Born: 22 November 1969 (age 56); Seoul, South Korea
- Education: Hongik University
- Occupation: Designer
- Years active: 2000–present

Korean name
- Hangul: 이상엽
- Hanja: 李相燁
- RR: I Sangyeop
- MR: I Sangyŏp

SangYup Lee (Korean: 이상엽; sometimes styled as Sang-yup, Sangyup, or Sang Yup; born 22 November 1969) is a South Korean automobile designer employed by Hyundai Motor Company as its Vice President of Design since June 2016. Prior to Hyundai, Lee worked for General Motors (2000–09) and Volkswagen AG (2010–16), where his notable designs included the Chevrolet Camaro (2010), Bentley Continental GT, and Bentley Flying Spur.

== Early life and education ==
SangYup Lee was born on 22 November 1969, in Seoul, South Korea. He attended an art cram school starting at the age of 12 and graduated from Hongik University with a degree in fine arts (sculpture). He came to the United States in 1995 to study automotive design at the ArtCenter College of Design in Pasadena, California. That choice was inspired by the Korean manhwa and 1995 drama Asphalt Man, starring Lee Byung-hun as an automobile designer, as well as a chance encounter with a Porsche in Itaewon.

== Career ==
I grew up in Korea with cars like Sephia and Elantra. I had little exposure to the world of sports cars, but that ended up working as an advantage. I had a fresh take on the old classic [Chevrolet Camaro].

— Lee Sang-yup, 2010 interview with The Korea Times

While he was studying at the ArtCenter College of Design, Lee participated in internships at Pininfarina and Porsche AG. After his graduation in 1999, Lee was hired by General Motors to lead the design for the next-generation Corvette. In addition to the fifth-generation Camaro, Lee was responsible for the design of the Cadillac Sixteen (2003), Buick Velite (2004), and Stingray Corvette (2009) concepts, the latter of which was featured as the character "Sideswipe" in the film Transformers: Revenge of the Fallen. While at GM, the peripatetic Lee lived in Detroit, Japan, Italy, and Australia while developing various designs, including projects with Gruppo Bertone and Holden.

After ten years at GM, Lee joined Volkswagen as chief exterior designer at the VW/Audi Advanced studio in January 2010, under Executive Design Director Jens Manske. That studio initially was in Simi Valley before moving to Santa Monica in 2006 and then Oxnard in 2020, being renamed Design Center California in the process. Walter de Silva, head of VW Group Design, changed the focus of the California studio from concepts to more practical cars in 2009. At DCC, Lee said he learned "all of design's precision execution" while acting in an internal design consulting role to other VW/Audi studios. In 2013, Lee was promoted to head the exterior design group of Bentley under Luc Donckerwolke, Bentley's director of design.

Lee left Bentley for Hyundai in June 2016, where he was reunited with his former boss, Donckerwolke. He later described the sense of freedom he gained from the move: "Bentley's legacy is unbelievable, but this weight from the legacy on your shoulders is quite heavy, so when you do the sketch you ask, is this 'Bentley' enough? With Hyundai you have more freedom." Lee was named the head of the Hyundai Global Design Center in 2018 and later was promoted to Executive Vice President of Design in December 2021, replacing Peter Schreyer.

=== Notable designs ===
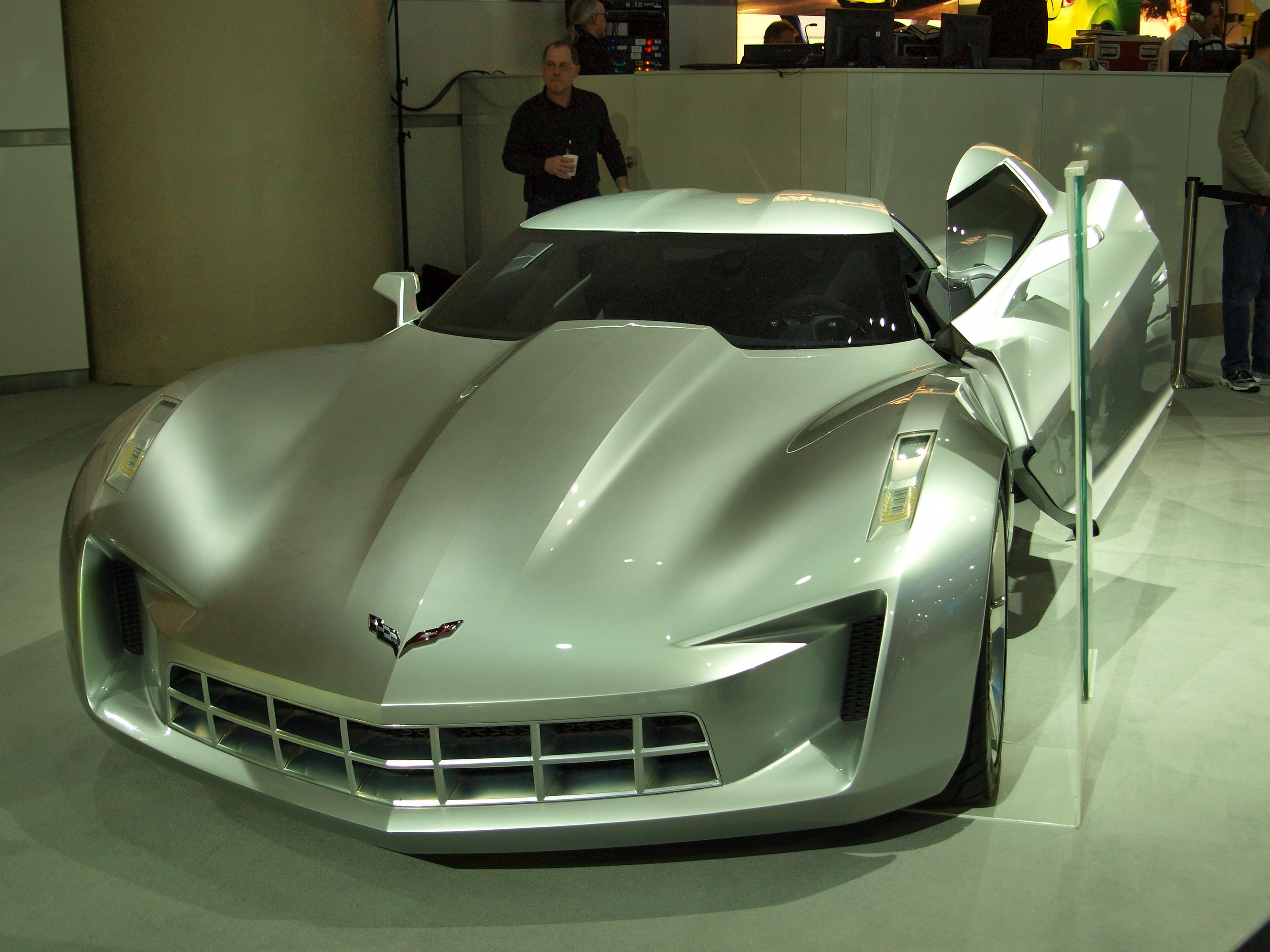
2009 Stingray Corvette concept

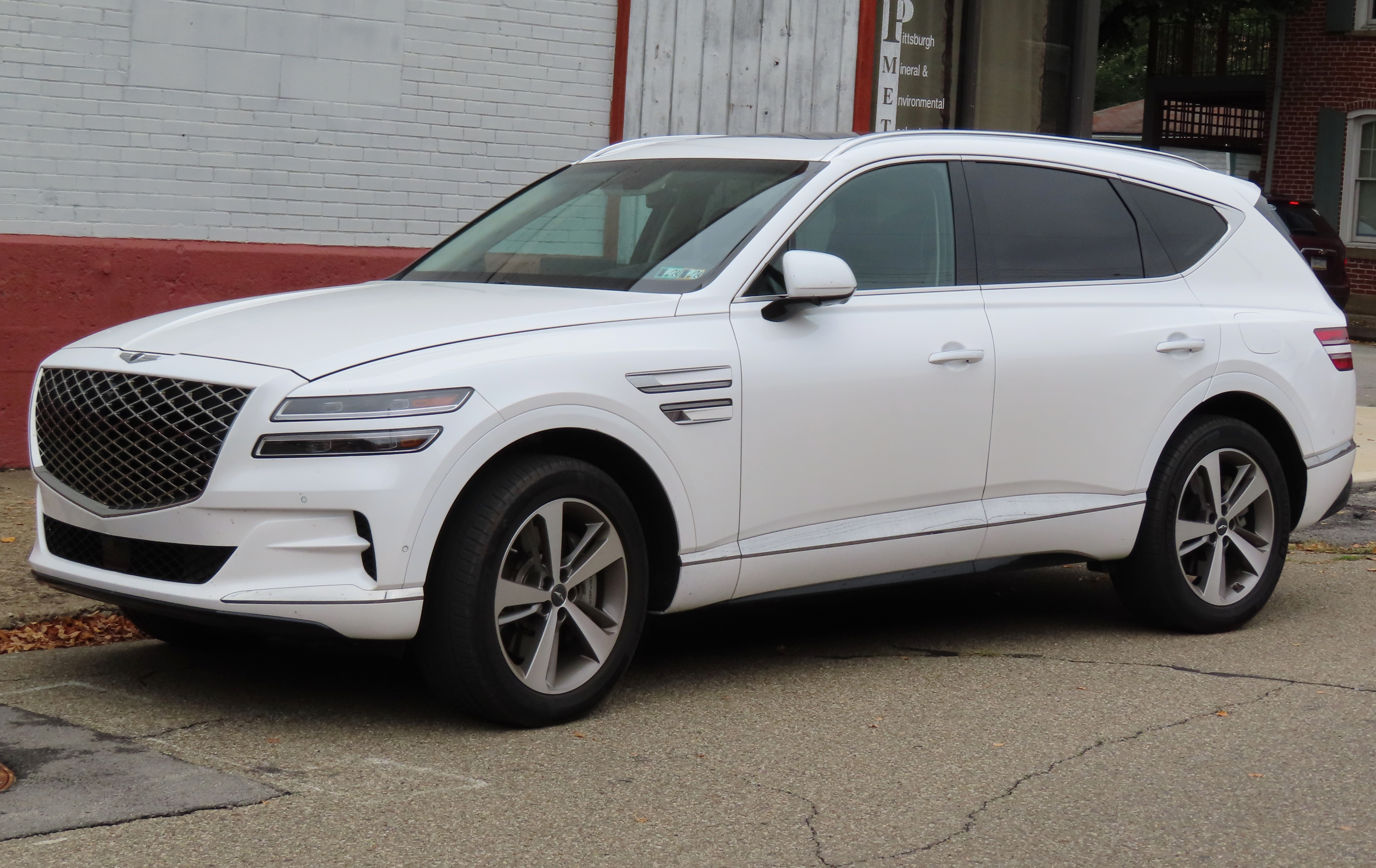
Genesis GV80

- Cadillac Sixteen concept, 2003
- Buick Velite concept, 2004
- Stingray Corvette concept, 2009
- Chevrolet Camaro, 2010
- Bentley Bentayga, 2015 (with Donckerwolke)
- Bentley EXP 10 Speed 6 concept, 2015 (with Donckerwolke)
- Genesis GV80, 2020
- Hyundai Ioniq 7 concept, 2021
- Hyundai N Vision 74 concept, 2022
