= Alura people =

Aboriginal Australian people of the Northern Territory

The Alura are an Aboriginal Australian people of the Northern Territory.

== Country ==
The Alura inhabited the area, estimated at 900 square miles (2,300 km^{2}), around the northern side of the lower Victorian river and extending east from its mouth towards the vicinity of Bradshaw.

== Social organisation ==
According to the early ethnographer Robert Hamilton Mathews, the Alura had an eight-section class system of the type he called Wombya.

== Language ==
There is no linguistic data available on the Alura people.

== Alternative names ==
- Allura
- Hallurra
- Nallura

== Sources ==
- Mathews, R. H. (July–September 1900). "Wombya organization of the Australian aborigines". American Anthropologist. 2 (3): 494–501. doi:10.1525/aa.1900.2.3.02a00050. JSTOR 658964.
- Spencer, Baldwin (1914). Native tribes of the Northern Territory of Australia (PDF). London: Macmillan Publishers.
- Tindale, Norman Barnett (1974). "Alura (NT)". Aboriginal Tribes of Australia: Their Terrain, Environmental Controls, Distribution, Limits, and Proper Names. Australian National University Press. ISBN 978-0-7081-0741-6. Archived from the original on 20 March 2020.
