= Allured Business Media =

American publisher

- Industry: Publisher
- Founded: 1960
- Headquarters: 336 Gundersen Drive; Suite A Carol Stream, IL 60188; United States
- Products: Books, Magazines, Trade Shows
- Website: http://www.allured.com

Allured Business Media is a family owned print media company located in Carol Stream, Illinois. The company, which changed its name from Allured Publishing Corporation in 2008, publishes several magazines and websites focused on specific industries and distributes various e-newsletters to accompany these publications.

== Origins of the Business ==
Earl R. Allured started The Manufacturing Confectioner magazine in 1921. After a few months, he needed experienced editorial and production help and hired Prudence M. Walker. Shortly thereafter, they were married. In the next five years, three sons-James, Stanley and Allen-were born. When the Great Depression hit in 1929, the business struggled, and in 1931, Earl died, leaving Prudence to take charge.

For the next 18 years, she managed the company, gradually building on its foundation as a technical magazine with broad international readership. She traveled extensively to get editorial material and sell advertising. She soon became the best known woman in the confectionery industry. She also gained honors in publishing, becoming the first female director of the American Business Press Association, a vice president and director of the Chicago Business Press, and president of the Women's Advertising Club of Chicago.

Her sons, Stan, Jim and Al, joined the company in February 1949, June 1949 and June 1950, respectively. They purchased The American Perfumer magazine in March 1960, which doubled the size of the company, and also resulted in the formation of Allured Publishing Corporation. Stan concentrated on the new magazine, becoming publisher in October 1962.

During the 1960s and 1970s, significant changes took place. Jim died suddenly in 1961; Prudence, after enjoying having her sons, and later her granddaughters, in business with her, retired in the early 1970s and died in 1976. The next generation of Allureds had arrived when Stan's daughter, Nancy, joined the company in November 1972. Another daughter, Jean, joined the company six months later in May, 1973 (and left in November 1994). Stan's wife Betty Lou joined the company in February 1976 and their third daughter, Janet Allured Ludwig, joined in February 1981.

It soon became clear that the two magazines had unique and sometimes incompatible needs. With a friendly parting of the ways in 1976, Al became sole owner of The Manufacturing Confectioner Publishing Company and still publishes The Manufacturing Confectioner in Glen Rock, New Jersey. Stan became sole owner of Allured Publishing Corporation.

== Cosmetics & Toiletries and Perfumer & Flavorist History ==
Over several years, The American Perfumer editorial had been making a transition from the essential oils trade where it had originally started to deal with the technology of cosmetic product. In recognition of this fact, the name of the publication was changed to American Cosmetics & Perfumery. Soon thereafter, in recognition of the growing worldwide circulation, "American" was dropped from the title. Another industry change was taking place, too. The few marketing companies still having perfumery departments closed them to take advantage of the specialized talents and efficiency of the perfumery suppliers. It was becoming more and more obvious that cosmetic and perfumery were two unique industries that required different publications.

As a result, Perfumer & Flavorist was published in 1975 as a section of Cosmetics & Perfumery. The following year, Allured published two separate magazines with Stan as publisher of both. Cosmetics & Toiletries and Perfumer & Flavorist remain the titles to this day.

After several years of Stan Allured filling the role of editor of both Cosmetics & Toiletries and Perfumer & Flavorist, Jean Allured took over the reins as publisher/editor of Cosmetics & Toiletries in 1986. Nancy Allured was responsible for advertising sales for both publications. In 1988, Jean and Janet planned the launch of Skin Inc. magazine, and Nancy became publisher of Cosmetics & Toiletries. At about the same time, Stan introduced a scientific journal as a companion to Perfumer & Flavorist titled the Journal of Essential Oil Research (JEOR).

== Recent Additions to the Company ==
In late 2001, Allured Publishing Corporation saw the opportunity to increase its product penetration in the cosmetic industry and purchased Global Cosmetic Industry (GCI) from Advanstar. The first issue that Allured produced was in February 2002. GCI magazine was the first purchase of an existing publication under the third generation of Allured management. Today, the GCI brand publishes a magazine that is both in print and digital formats.

A Cosmetics & Toiletries audit classification job category "estheticians" emerged in the late 1980s. After some investigation, it became clear that there was room in esthetics, also known as the professional (salon) skin care industry, for a magazine. Allured Publishing Corporation answered this need. The premier issue of Skin Inc. magazine was mailed in fall 1988, with Jean as publisher. After establishing the brand within the spa and salon industry, Jean left the company in 1994 to pursue other interests, and a member of the magazine's start-up team became publisher. The spa division expanded to include Skin Inc. magazine and its ancillaries, including the Face & Body trade shows held in Northern California and Chicago.

In 2007, Allured pulled the book publishing out of the magazine brands and started the Allured Books Division. Today Allured Books offers specialty science books and reference materials in the fields of Cosmetic Chemistry, Flavor Chemistry, Fragrance Creation and Spa Business & Wellness.

== The Stanley Allured Lifetime Service Award ==
In 2010, the Midwest Chapter of the Society of Cosmetic Chemists created the "Stanley Allured Lifetime Service Award" to recognize the founder of Allured Publishing Corporation, Stanley Allured, for a lifetime of distinguished contributions, achievements and service to the Chapter. The Midwest SCC Chapter awards deserving individuals on the basis of dedicated service over the course of many years.

== Publications ==
- Cosmetics & Toiletries magazine
