= Alure =

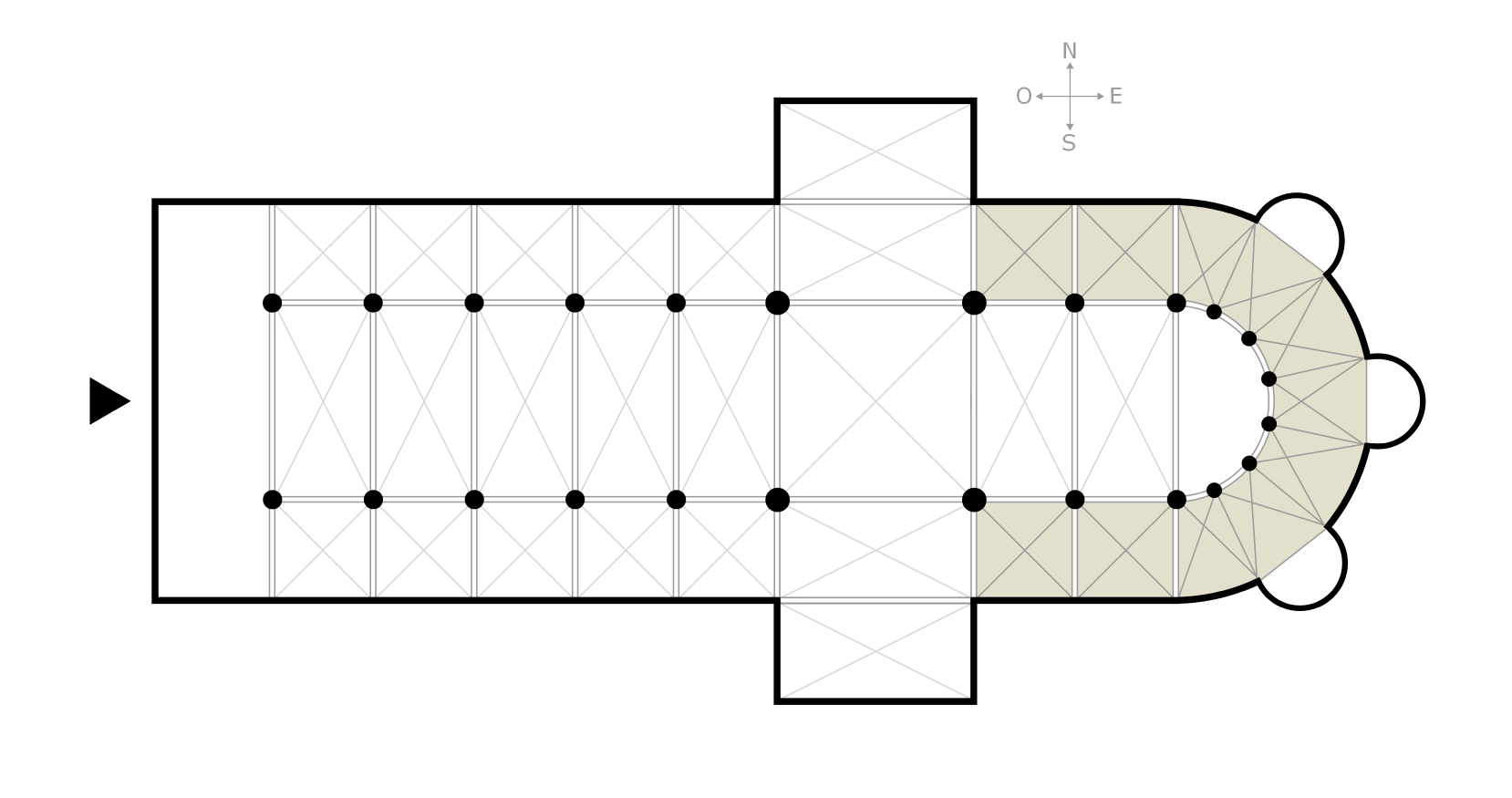
Diagram of Ambulatory

An alure (O. Fr., from aller, "to walk") or allure is an architectural term for an alley, passage, the water-way or flat gutter behind a parapet, the galleries of a clerestory, or sometimes even the aisle itself of a church. The term is occasionally written valure or valoring. It may also be used to refer to a wall-walk on a castle wall.

== See also ==
- Wall-walk
