= Buick Velite (concept car) =

Overview
- Manufacturer: Buick (General Motors)
- Designer: SangYup Lee

Body and chassis
- Class: Concept sports car
- Body style: 2-door coupe 2-door convertible
- Layout: FR layout
- Platform: GM Zeta platform

Powertrain
- Engine: 3.6 L V6 twin-turbo
- Transmission: 6-speed automatic

The Buick Velite is a roadster concept car designed by Buick and built by Gruppo Bertone, using the Zeta platform. It was first presented to the public at the 2004 New York International Auto Show.
