= General Motors Lambda platform =

GM Lambda platform
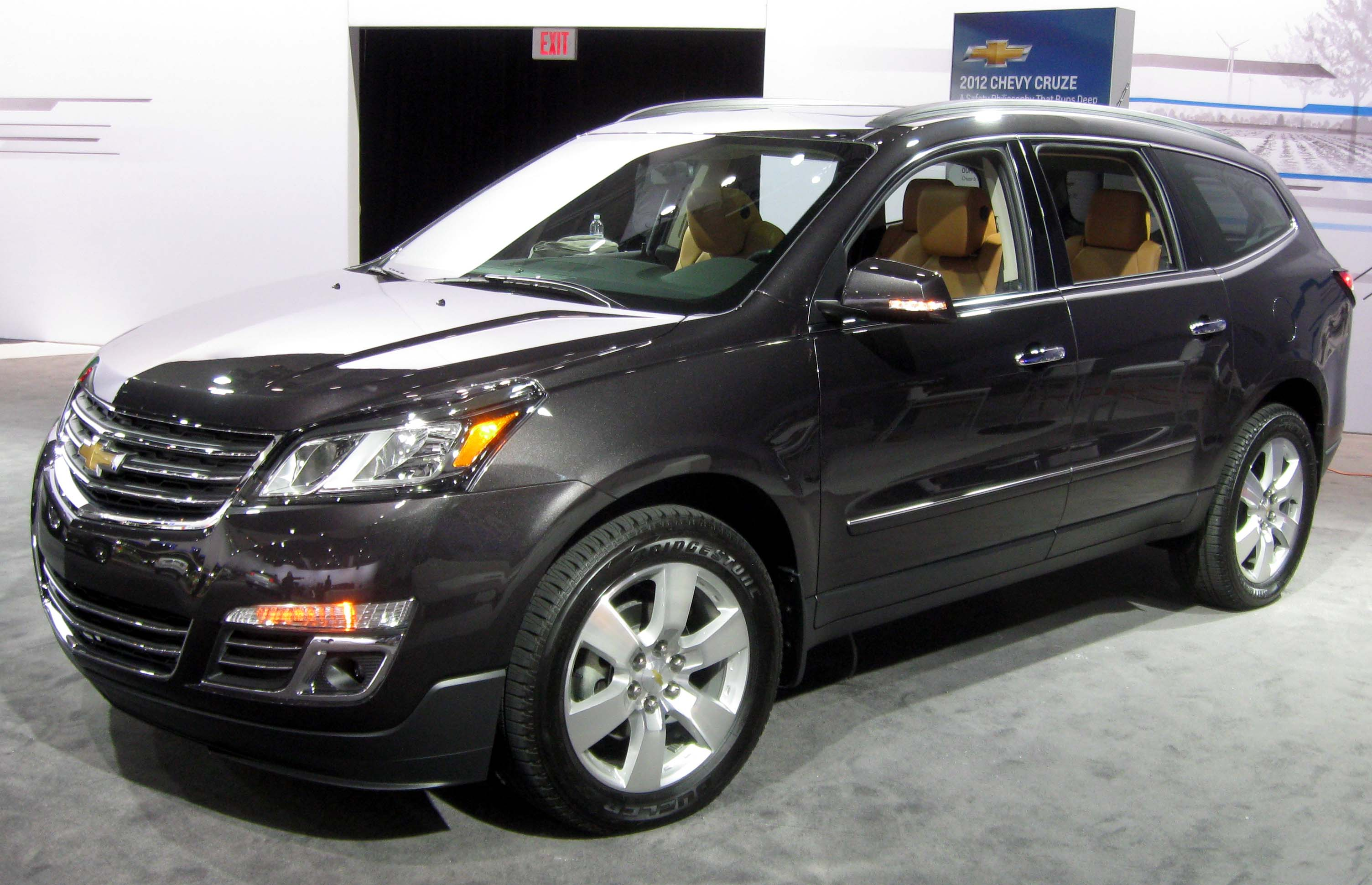

Overview
- Manufacturer: General Motors
- Production: 2006–2017

Body and chassis
- Class: Full-size crossover SUV
- Layout: FF layout/All wheel drive
- Body style: 4-door SUV
- Vehicles: Saturn Outlook; GMC Acadia; Buick Enclave; Chevrolet Traverse

Powertrain
- Transmission: 6-speed automatic

Chronology
- Predecessor: GM U platform GMT360; GMT370 (For GMC Acadia)
- Successor: GM C1XX platform

Lambda is General Motors full-size or mid-size 3-row crossover SUV automobile platform. It is largely derived from the GM Epsilon platform, which underlies the Chevrolet Malibu sedan and similar models.

The Buick Enclave concept car was previewed at the 2006 North American International Auto Show, and the Saturn Outlook was shown at the 2006 New York Auto Show. The 2007 Outlook and GMC Acadia went into production in late 2006, followed by the 2008 Enclave in mid-2007, and the 2009 Chevrolet Traverse in mid-2008.

Lambda vehicles feature easily accessible three-row seating. They were supplied with the LY7 3.6-liter V6. Starting with the 2009 model year all Lambda vehicles have GM LLT 3.6-liter gasoline direct injection engine for improved fuel efficiency, horsepower and torque. With the cancellation of GM's next-generation DOHC V8, there would be no V8 powertrain for the Lambda platform. The platform has been designed for front and all-wheel drive applications.

Lambda vehicles are produced in the new Lansing Delta Township Assembly plant near Lansing, Michigan. The Traverse began production in September 2008 at a retooled Spring Hill Assembly Plant in Tennessee, but production was later moved to Lansing. GM discontinued the Outlook after the 2010 model year along with the entire Saturn brand.

Meanwhile, GM announced a facelift of its GMC Acadia for the 2013 model year, taking the bodyshell of the discontinued Saturn Outlook, while at the same time, GM would refresh its Buick Enclave and Chevrolet Traverse vehicles.

== Minivans ==
GM was considering replacing the U-body minivans with new minivans using the Lambda platform for the 2009 model year, but due to the decline of minivan sales the plan was cancelled.

== Vehicles ==
Vehicles based on this platform:

- 2007–2010 Saturn Outlook
- 2007–2016 GMC Acadia
- 2008–2017 Buick Enclave
- 2009–2017 Chevrolet Traverse
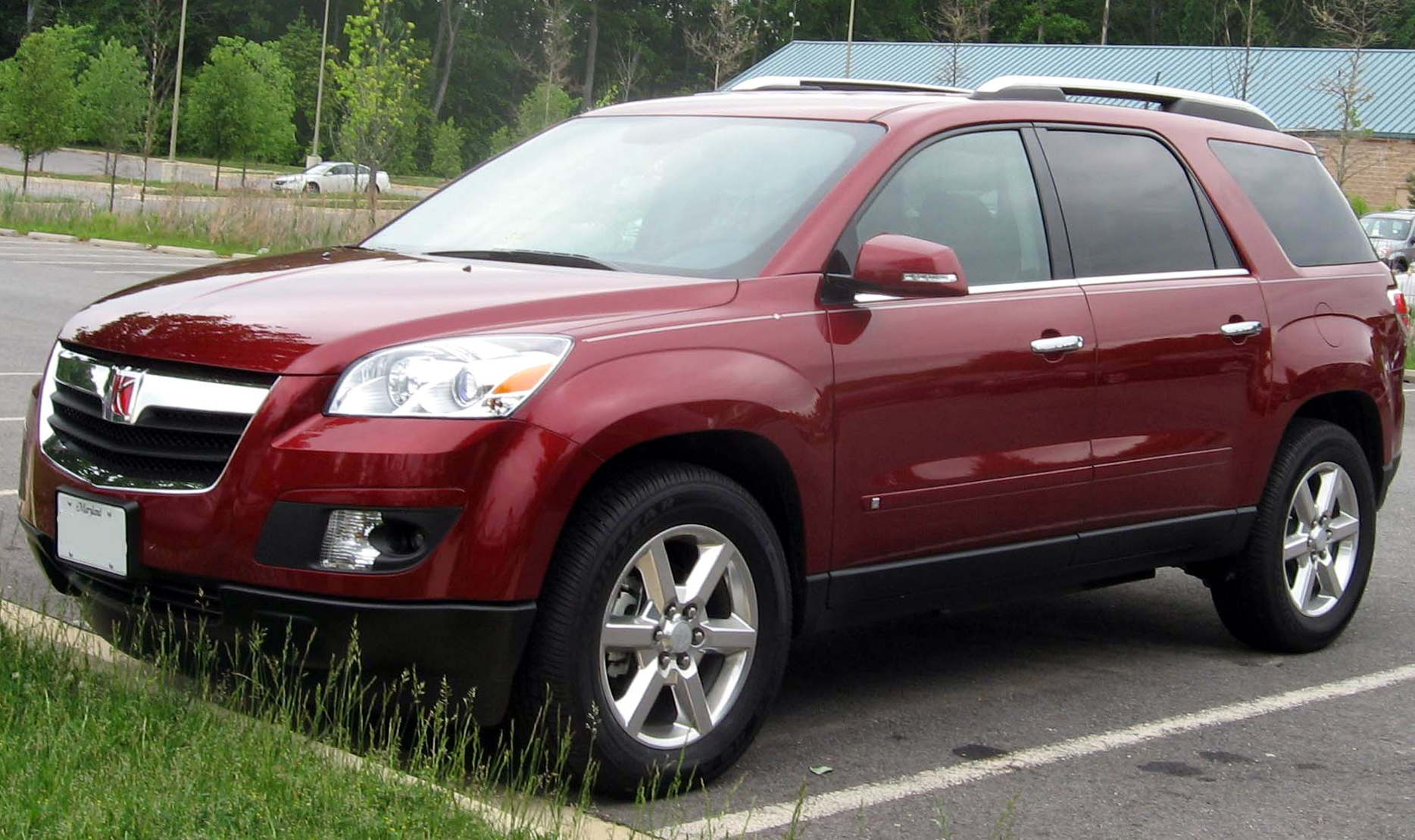
Saturn Outlook

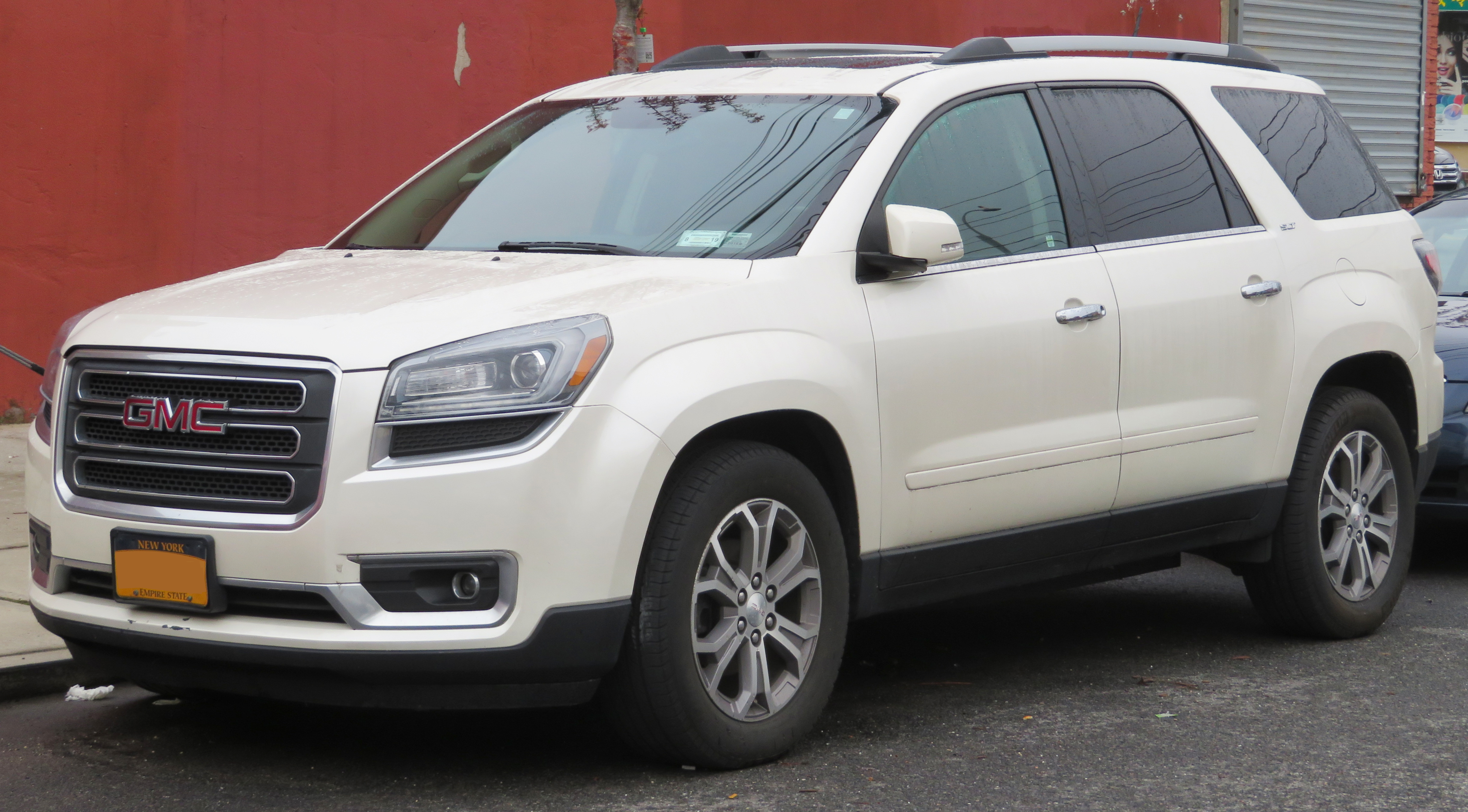
GMC Acadia

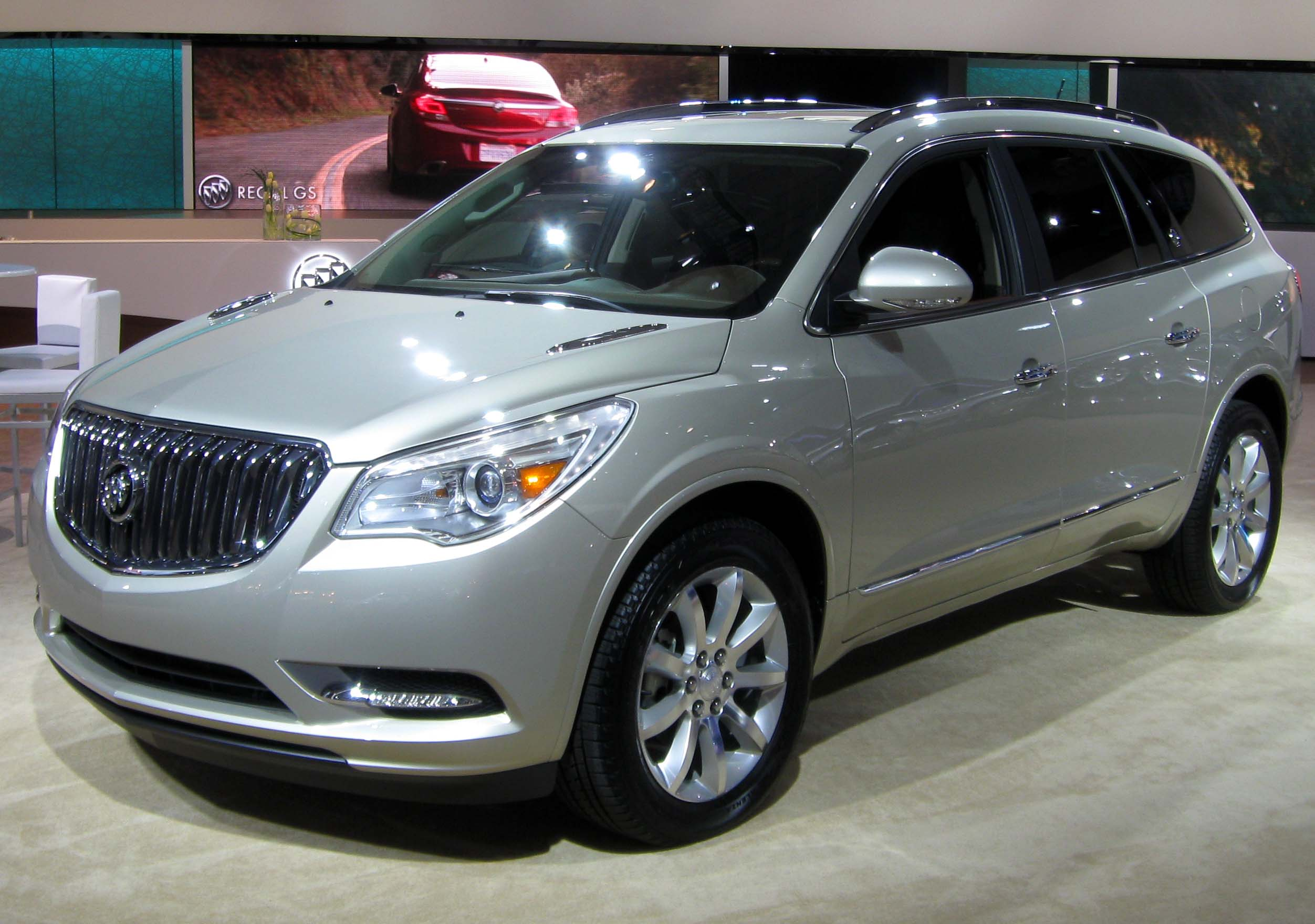
Buick Enclave

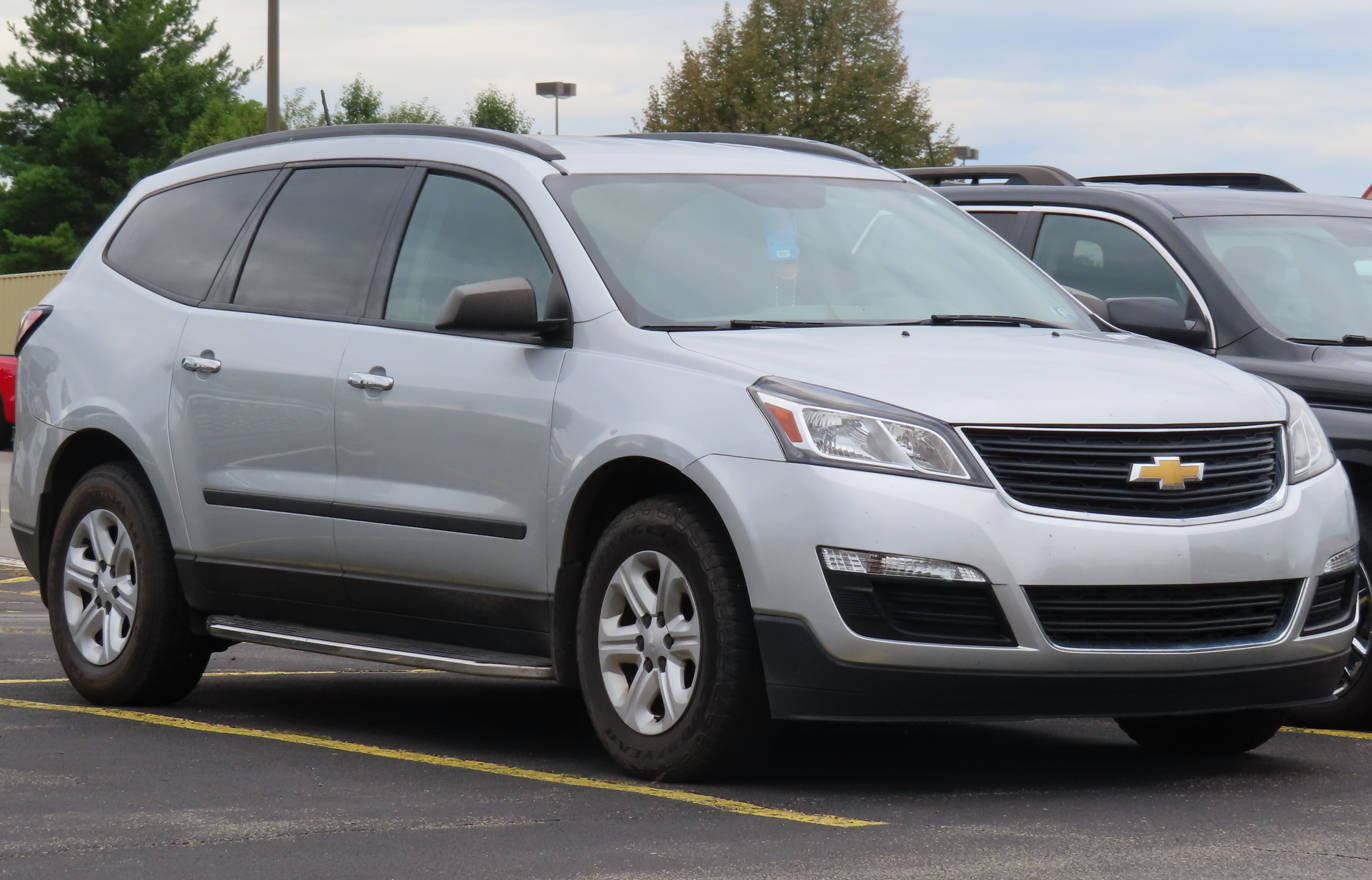
Chevrolet Traverse

== Sales ==
Calendar Year	Total US sales	Acadia	Enclave	Outlook	Traverse
2006	624	480	-	144	-
2007	136,799	72,765	29,286	34,748	-
2008	145,942	66,440	44,706	25,340	9,456
2009	201,159	53,820	43,150	13,115	91,074
2010	230,465	68,295	55,426		106,744
2011	244,811	79,288	58,392		107,131
2012	220,589	78,280	56,703		85,606
2013	246,794	89,793	60,534		96,467
2014	250,215	83,972	62,300		103,943
2015	278,419	96,393	62,081		119,945

== See also ==
- List of General Motors platforms
