= Buick Enclave =

Full-size crossover SUV

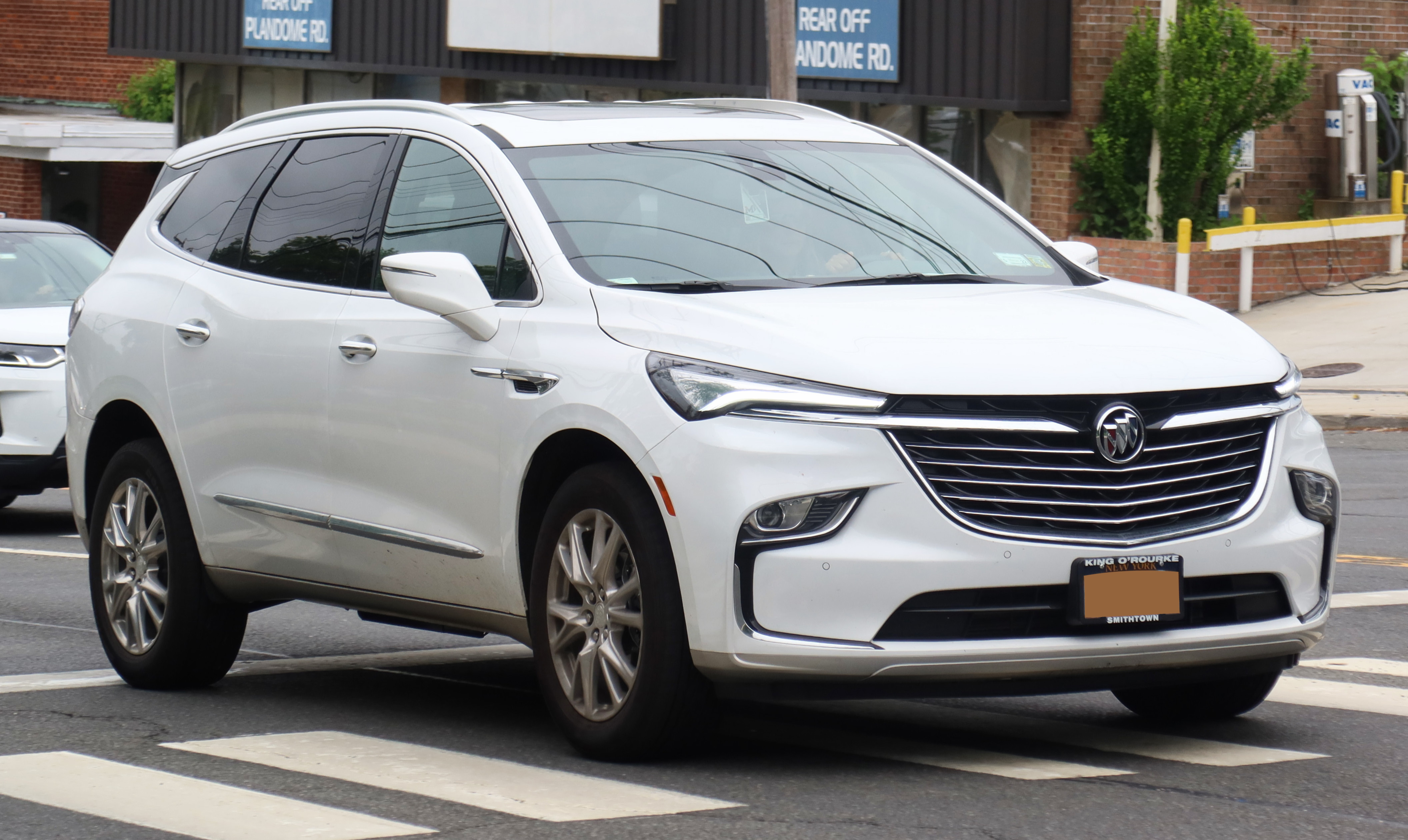
- 2022 Buick Enclave Essence (facelift)

Overview
- Manufacturer: Buick (General Motors)
- Production: April 2007–present
- Model years: 2008–present

Body and chassis
- Class: Full-size crossover SUV
- Body style: 5-door SUV
- Layout: Front-engine, front-wheel-drive or all-wheel-drive

Chronology
- Predecessor: Buick Rainier; Buick Rendezvous; Buick Terraza

The Buick Enclave is a three-row full-size crossover SUV produced by General Motors since 2007. It was previewed at the 2006 North American International Auto Show, officially as a concept car, making it the first Lambda vehicle to be displayed. The Enclave is partially based on the Buick Centieme concept shown at the 2003 Detroit Auto Show.

The first-generation Enclave, the Saturn Outlook, the original GMC Acadia, and the first-generation Chevrolet Traverse all shared the GM Lambda platform.

The Enclave replaced both of Buick's SUVs, the minivan-based Rendezvous and the truck-based Rainier, as well as the Terraza minivan. The second-generation Enclave was officially revealed at the 2017 New York International Auto Show.

== First generation (2008) ==
First generation
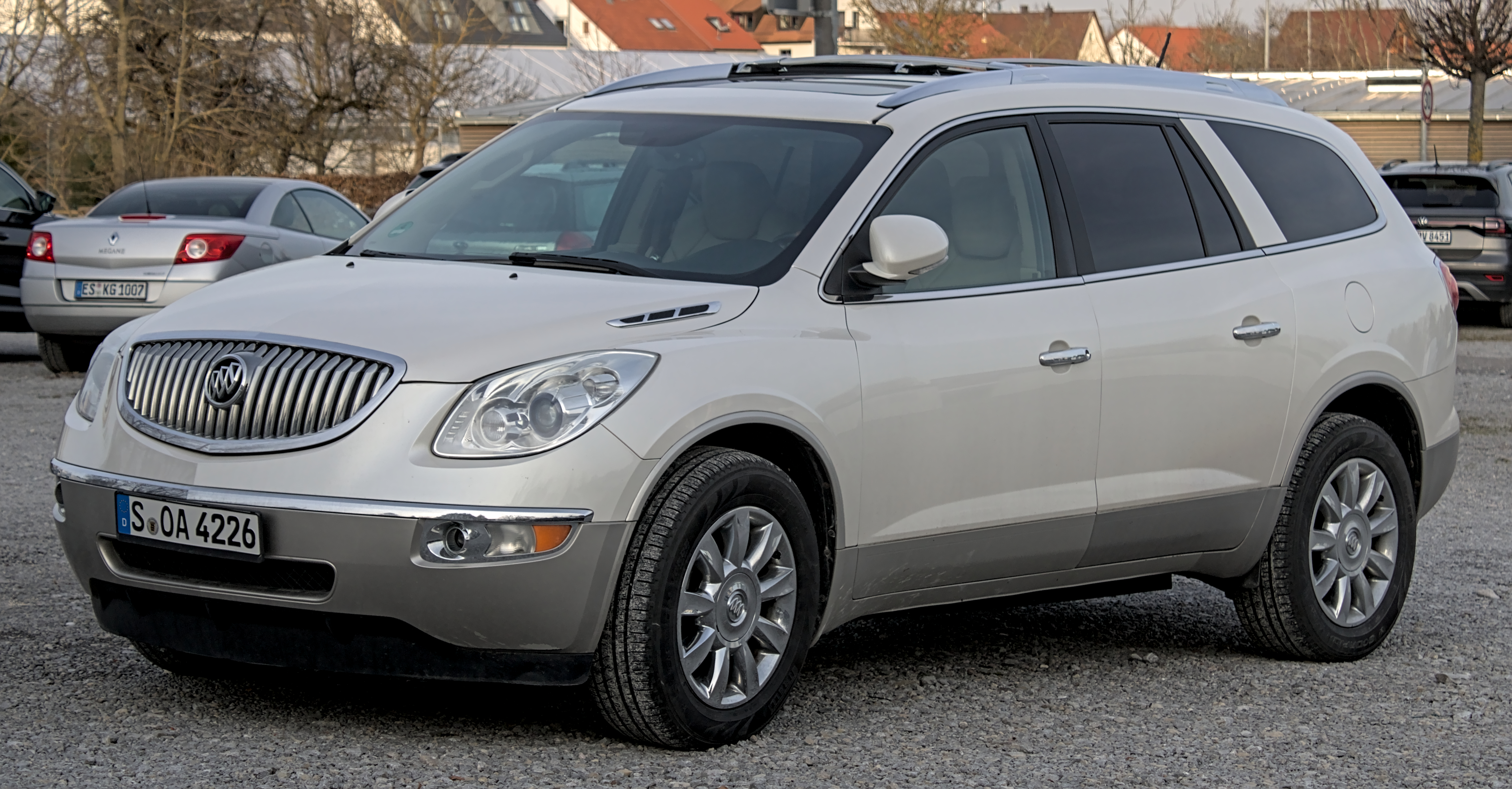

Overview
- Production: April 2007–2017
- Model years: 2008–2017
- Assembly: United States: Delta Township, Michigan (Lansing Delta Township Assembly)
- Designer: Jack Folden

Body and chassis
- Platform: GM Lambda platform/GMT967
- Related: Chevrolet Traverse; GMC Acadia; Saturn Outlook

Powertrain
- Engine: 3.6 L LY7/LLT V6
- Transmission: 6-speed 6T75 automatic

Dimensions
- Wheelbase: 118.9 in (3,020 mm)
- Length: 201.8 in (5,126 mm) (2008–2012); 201.9 in (5,128 mm) (2013–2017)
- Width: 79 in (2,007 mm)
- Height: 72.2 in (1,834 mm) (2008–2009); 72.5 in (1,842 mm) (2010–2013); 71.7 in (1,821 mm) (2013–2017)
- Curb weight: 4,780–4,985 lb (2,168–2,261 kg)

=== Features ===
The Enclave has seating for seven passengers, with an optional second row bench seat instead of the standard two captain chairs which increases the seating to eight. It comes standard with front-wheel drive with an option of all-wheel drive.

The Enclave shares powertrains with its Lambda siblings. For its first year of production, the Enclave was powered by a 275-horsepower (205 kW; 279 PS) 3.6 L High Feature V6 engine mated to a six-speed automatic transmission. For the 2009 model, an upgraded power boost for the 3.6 L V6 Spark Ignition Direct Injection VVT produces 288 hp (215 kW; 292 PS) and 270 lb⋅ft (366 N⋅m; 37 kg⋅m) of torque standard (also standard on other 2009 Lambdas). The latter direct-injection engine offers a broader torque curve, and brings fuel economy to 17 mpg_{‑US} (14 L/100 km; 20 mpg_{‑imp})/24 mpg_{‑US} (9.8 L/100 km; 29 mpg_{‑imp}) for FWD models and 16 mpg_{‑US} (15 L/100 km; 19 mpg_{‑imp})/22 mpg_{‑US} (11 L/100 km; 26 mpg_{‑imp}) for AWD models, according to the new United States Environmental Protection Agency estimates. The Lambda vehicles are built at GM's new Delta Township Assembly plant near Lansing, Michigan, and production of the Enclave commenced on April 11, 2007, with the first vehicles reaching certain dealers by the end of the month. The Enclave debuted with a starting price of $32,790.

In its first year of production, the Enclave was often criticized for its 6-speed transmission, which was "hesitant to downshift." The powertrain was improved for 2009. For its entire production, it has been regarded as overly heavy, weighing nearly 5,000 pounds (2,300 kg) with all-wheel-drive. Buick's VentiPorts have reappeared at the Enclave's introduction, a styling feature unique to Buick dating back to 1949.

Initial sales of the Enclave far exceeded production capacity, forcing GM to add a third shift to the Delta Township plant.

With the arrival of the Buick Envision (which is slotted between the Enclave and Buick Encore) to North America in 2016 (for the 2017 model year), the Enclave became larger after Envision's debut, and the 2017 model year Enclave was the last under the first generation platform.

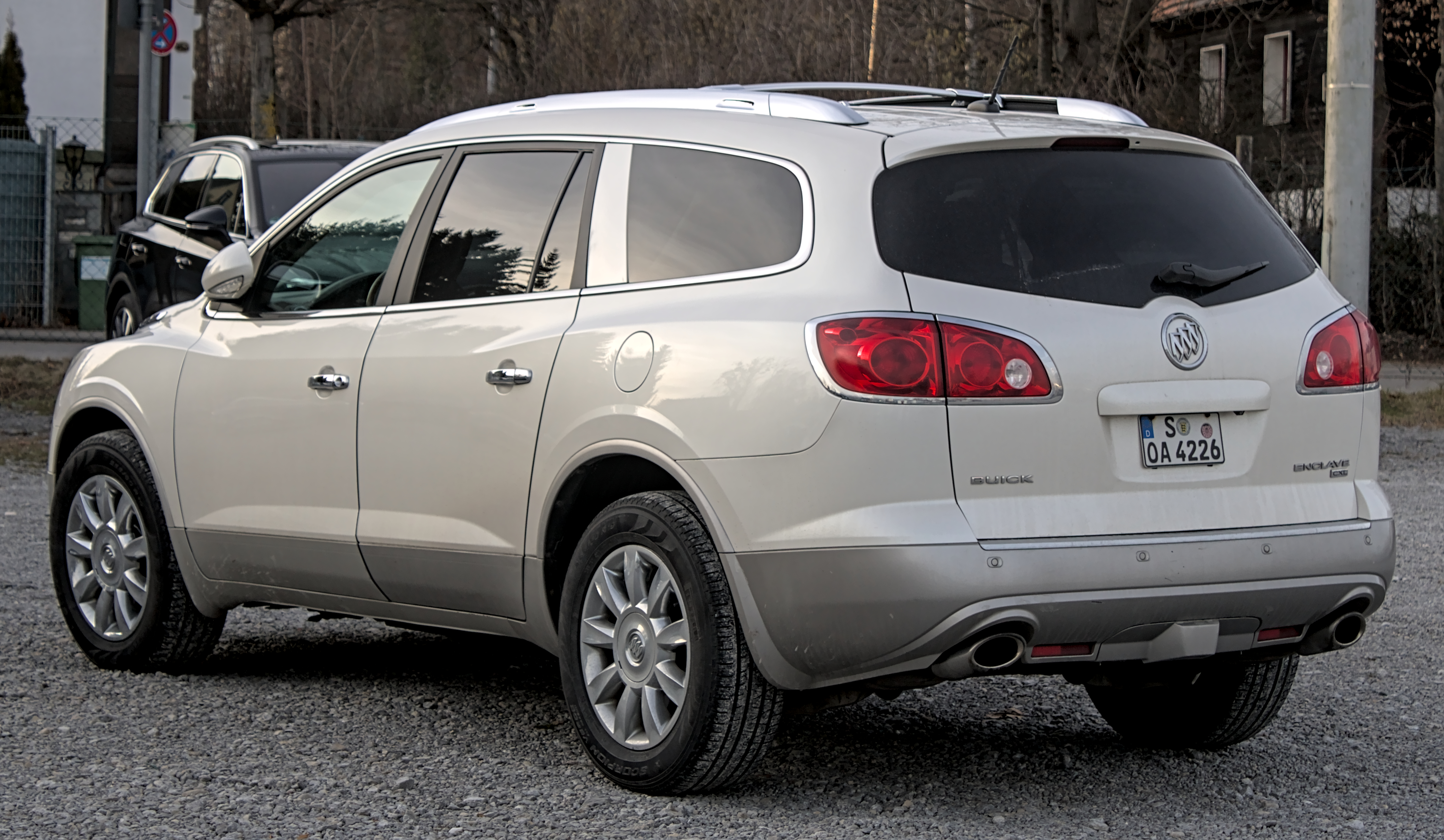
Rear view

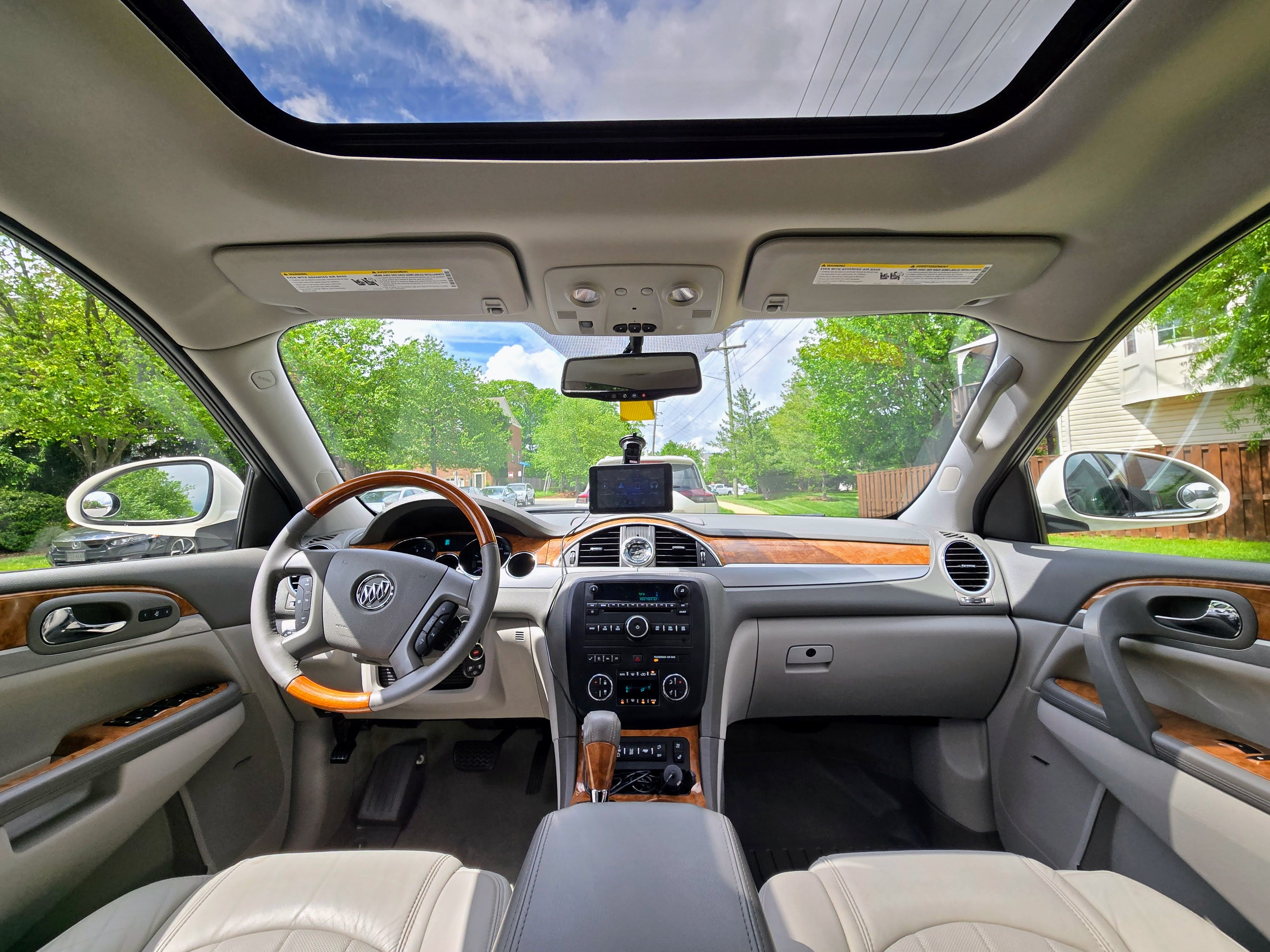
2012 Enclave dashboard

=== 2013 refresh ===
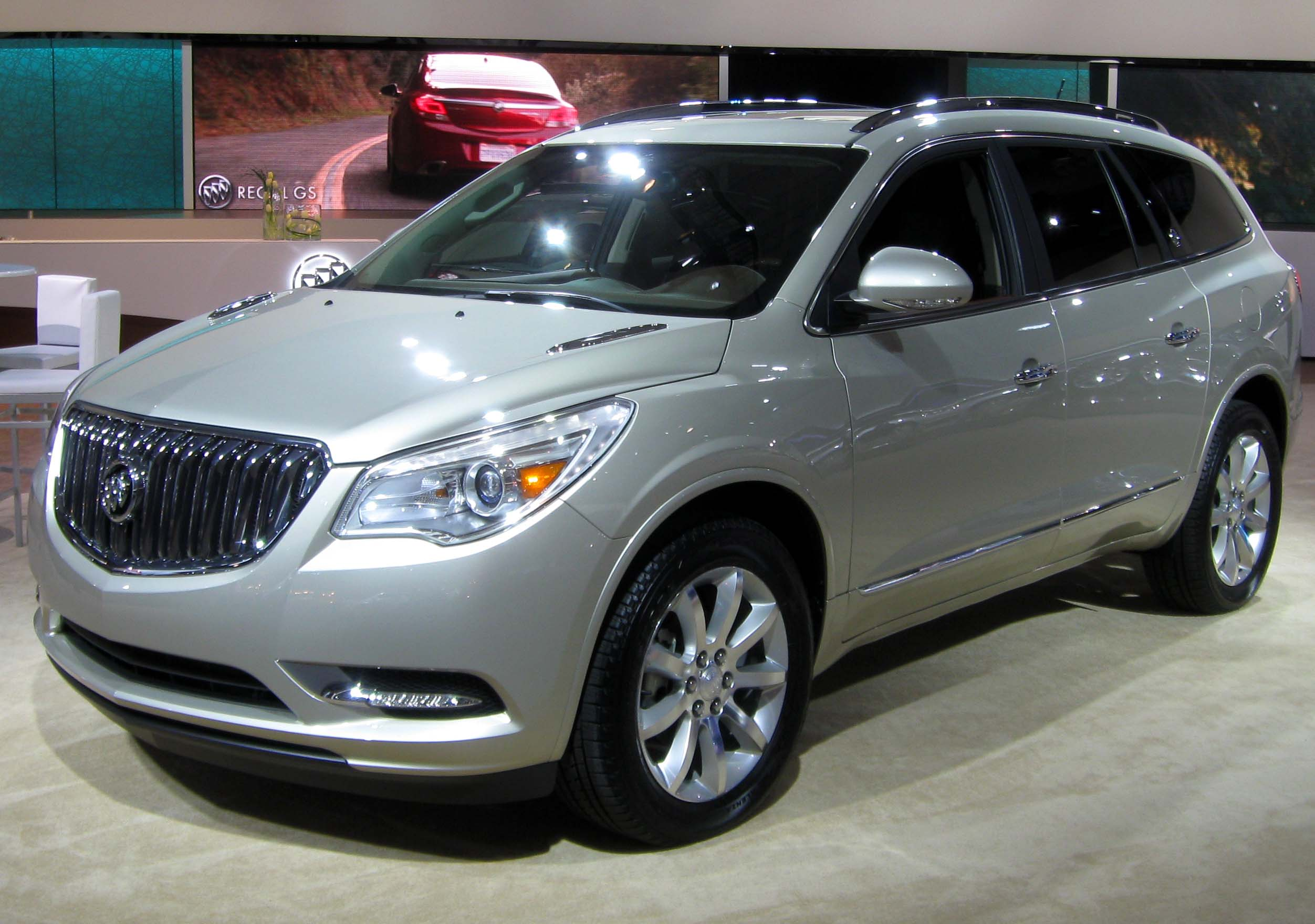
Buick Enclave

GM unveiled the 2013 Buick Enclave on April 3, 2012, one day before its official debut at the New York Auto Show. The 2013 model features revised exterior styling including a new chrome waterfall grille, xenon headlights with LED running lights, LED Foglights, and LED taillights. Interior updates include a redesigned dashboard with more soft-touch materials, wood and chrome accents, blue ambient lighting, and touchscreen IntelliLink infotainment display. Among safety features are seven standard airbags, including an industry-first front center airbag, and available blind spot monitoring.

=== Markets ===
Sales in the United States and Canada began in 2007 during the 2008 model year. In 2008, General Motors began exporting the Enclave to China, to be sold through Shanghai GM's Buick network.

The Buick brand has been relaunched in Mexico for the 2010 model year, bringing the Enclave to that market.

=== Safety ===
The 2008 Enclave was awarded "Top Safety Pick" by IIHS.

IIHS scores (2008)
Moderate overlap front (original test)	Good
Side (original test)	Good
Head restraints and seats	Good

== Second generation (2018) ==
=== North America (2018) ===
Second generation (North America)
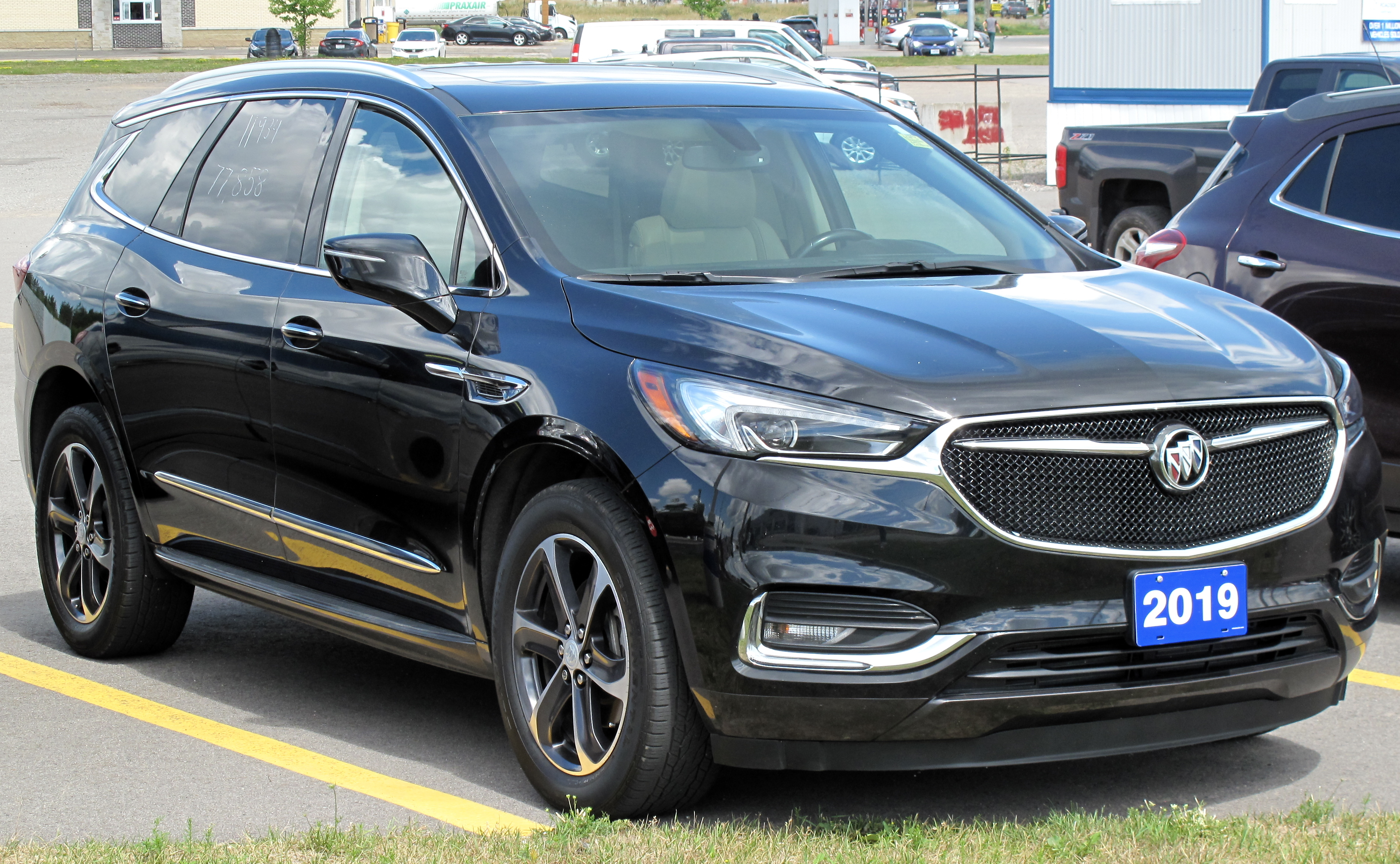

Overview
- Production: 2017–2024
- Model years: 2018–2024
- Assembly: United States: Delta Township, Michigan (Lansing Delta Township Assembly)

Body and chassis
- Platform: GM C1XX platform
- Related: GMC Acadia; Chevrolet Traverse; Cadillac XT5/Cadillac XT6

Powertrain
- Engine: 3.6 L LFY V6 (gasoline)
- Transmission: 9-speed GM 9T65 automatic

Dimensions
- Wheelbase: 120.9 in (3,071 mm)
- Length: 204.3 in (5,189 mm)
- Width: 78.8 in (2,002 mm)
- Height: 69.9 in (1,775 mm)
- Curb weight: 4,359–4,685 lb (1,977–2,125 kg)

On April 11, 2017, exactly ten years after the first Enclave was produced, Buick unveiled the second generation Enclave at the Pier 59 Studios during the 2017 New York International Auto Show. With the introduction of the compact Buick Envision in 2016 and the launching of the Opel Insignia-badged Buick Regal TourX wagon, the next generation Enclave moved upmarket, competing with the Volvo XC90, Infiniti QX60, and Acura MDX in the premium crossover SUV market. The second generation Enclave went on sale in late 2017 as a 2018 model.

The long-wheelbase version of GM's C1XX chassis sharing the same platform with the Chevrolet Traverse, the second generation Enclave moved away from the egg-shaped design but retains some elements of the previous generation, displaying a sleeker aerodynamic appearance, a lower roofline, and the introduction of the Evonik Acrylite exterior forward lighting flanking Buick's new three-dimensional mesh grille with chrome wings.

Powered by a 3.6-liter V-6 mated to a new nine-speed automatic transmission, it produces 310 hp (231 kW; 314 PS) with 266 lb⋅ft (361 N⋅m; 37 kg⋅m) torque. The second generation Enclave comes standard in front-wheel drive or available with Intelligent AWD with an active twin-clutch rear differential, which complements its first switchable all-wheel-drive system. There are three trim levels, including a new top-of-the-line Avenir trim, equivalent to the Denali trim on GMC vehicles.

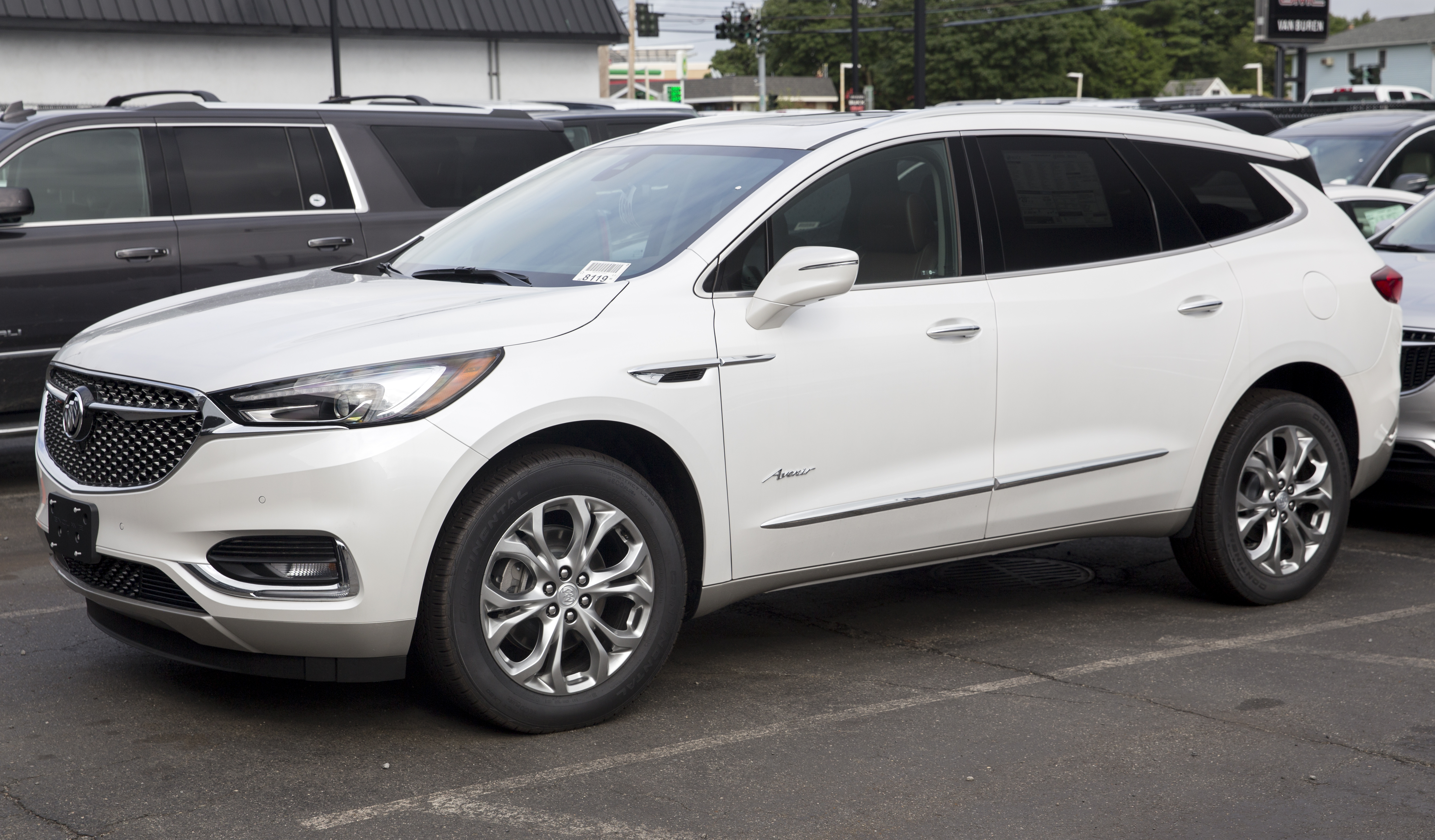
2018 Buick Enclave Avenir AWD

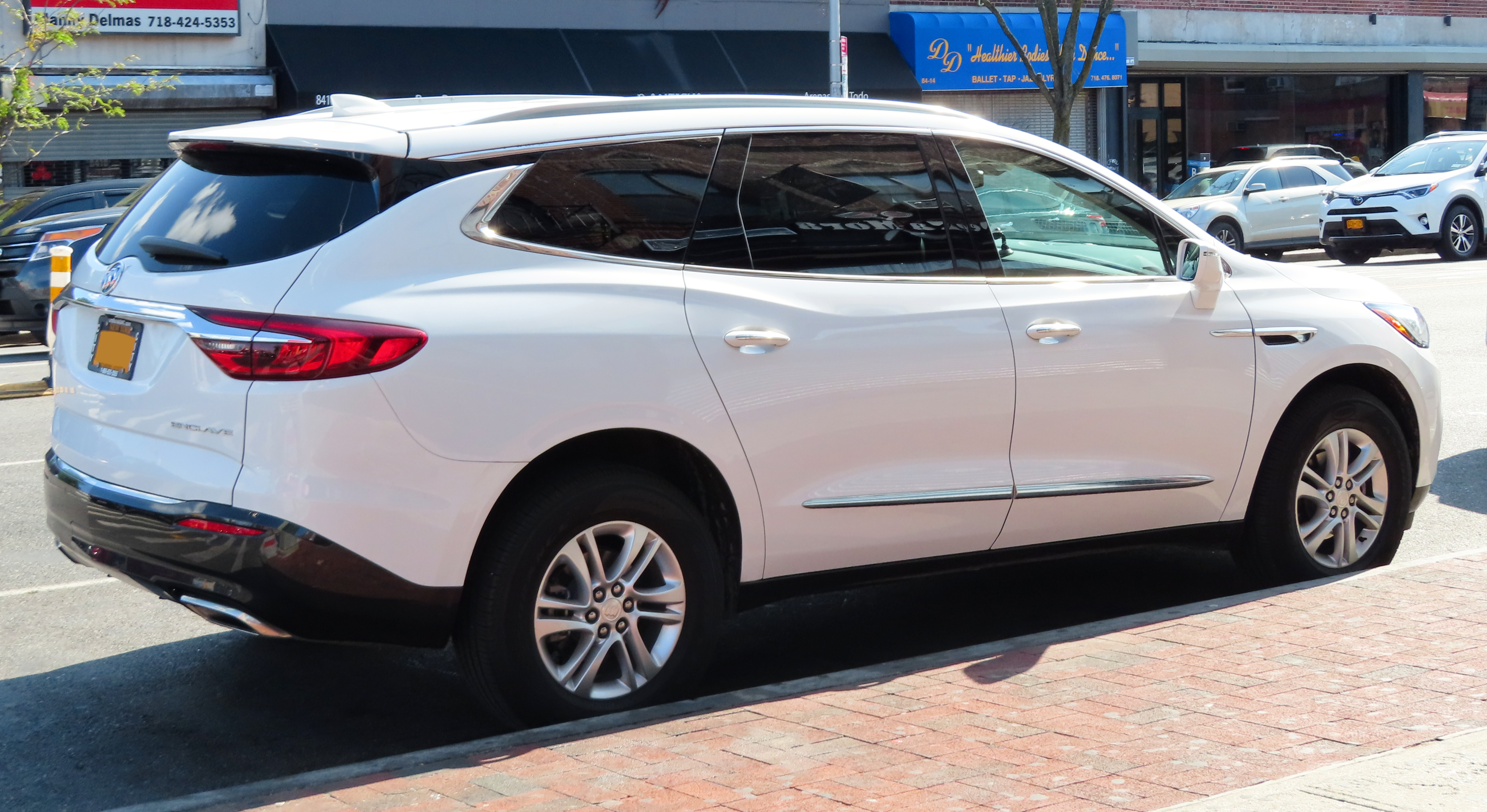
2019 Buick Enclave

==== 2022 refresh ====
Buick initially planned to launch an updated version of the Enclave in mid- to late 2020 as a 2021 model year vehicle, but GM delayed launch and production of the updated Enclave to 2021 as 2022 model year vehicle. The mid-cycle refresh adopts many design elements and features along with new LED headlights and taillights already seen on the Chinese version of the Buick Enclave.

The 2022 Enclave adds as standard a driver assistance safety suite previously only available in the Avenir trim. Features include front pedestrian braking, automatic emergency braking, lane keep assist, blind spot monitor, rear cross traffic alert, and rear parking sensor. Other new features include a push-button transmission, optional head-up display, optional rear pedestrian alert, and wireless Android Auto and Apple CarPlay.

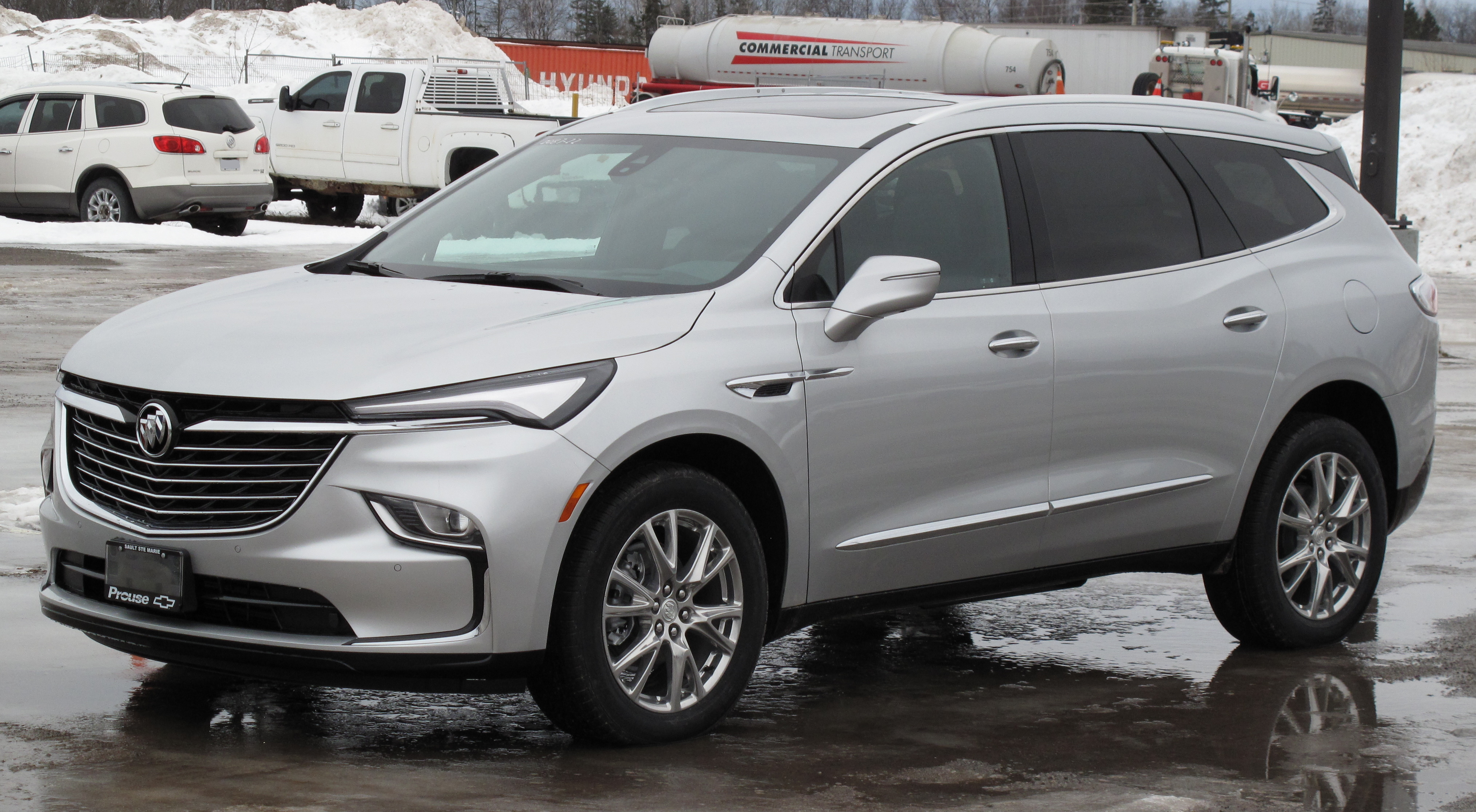
2022 Buick Enclave Premium AWD

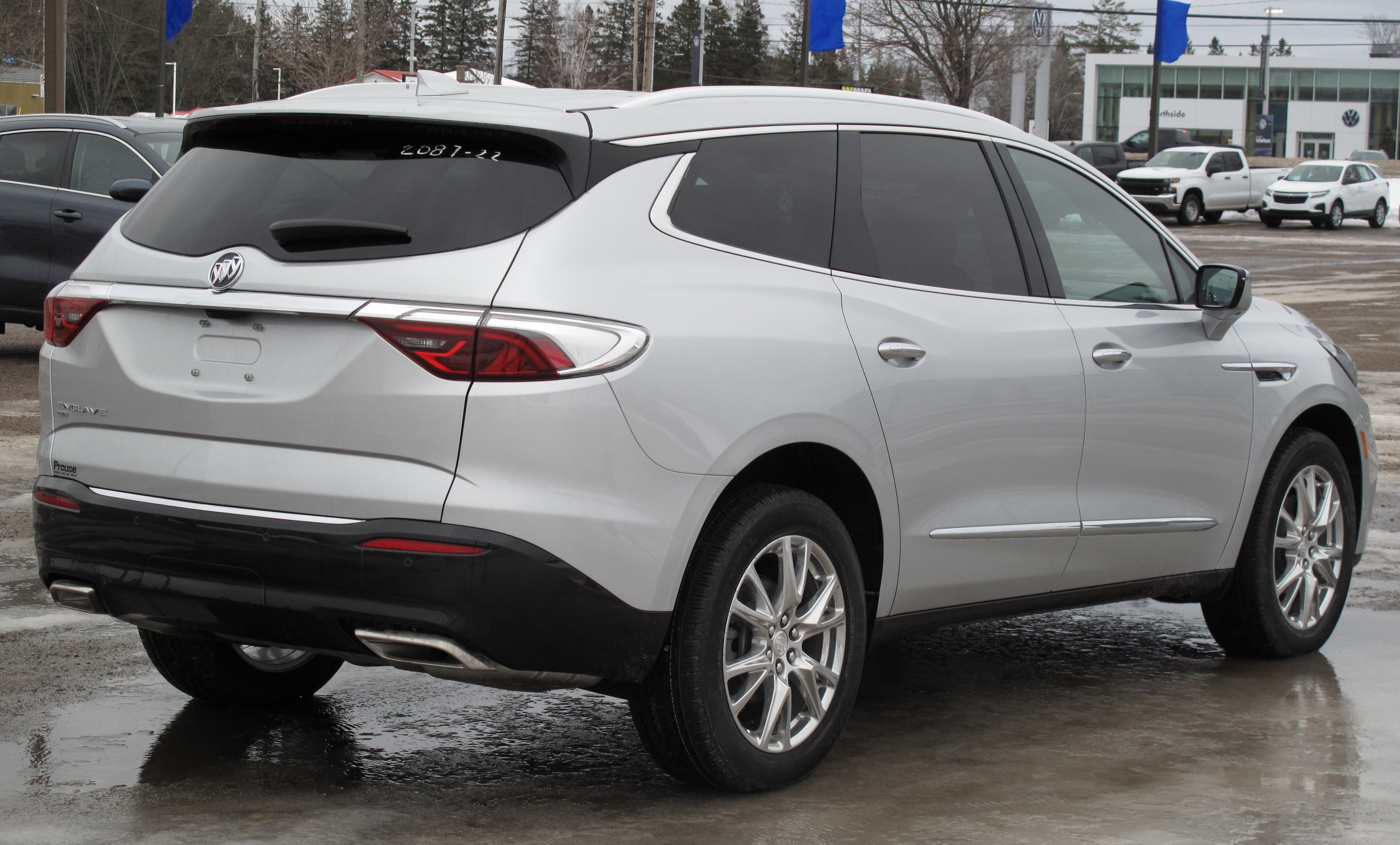
2022 Buick Enclave Premium AWD

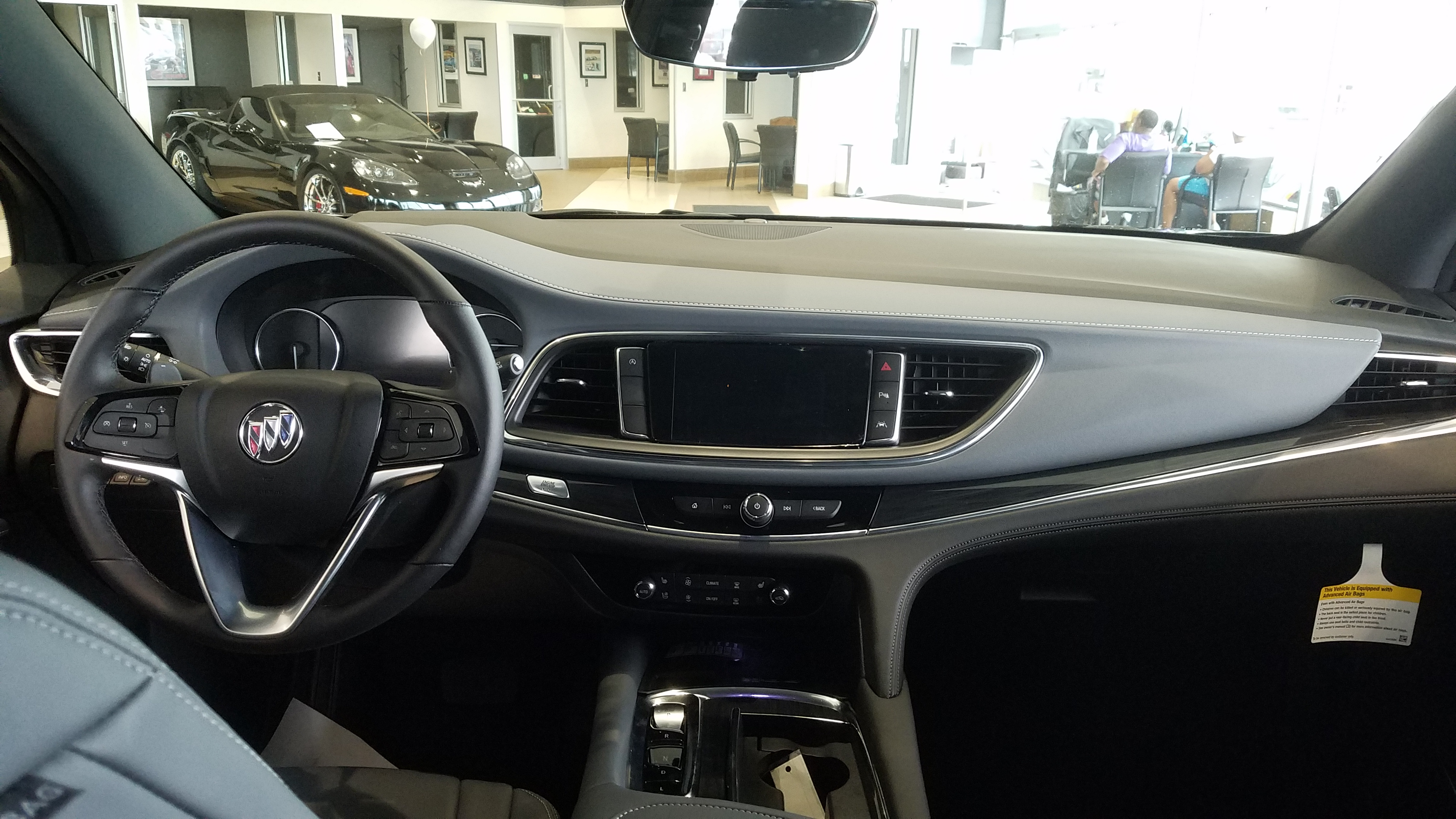
Interior

==== Safety ====
IIHS scores (2018)
Small overlap front (Driver)	Good	
Small overlap front (Passenger)	Good	
Moderate overlap front (original test)	Good	
Side (original test)	Good	
Side (updated test)	Acceptable	
Roof strength	Good	
Head restraints and seats	Good	
Front crash prevention: vehicle-to-vehicle	Superior	
Front crash prevention: vehicle-to-pedestrian	Superior	Advanced

=== China (2020) ===
Second generation (China)
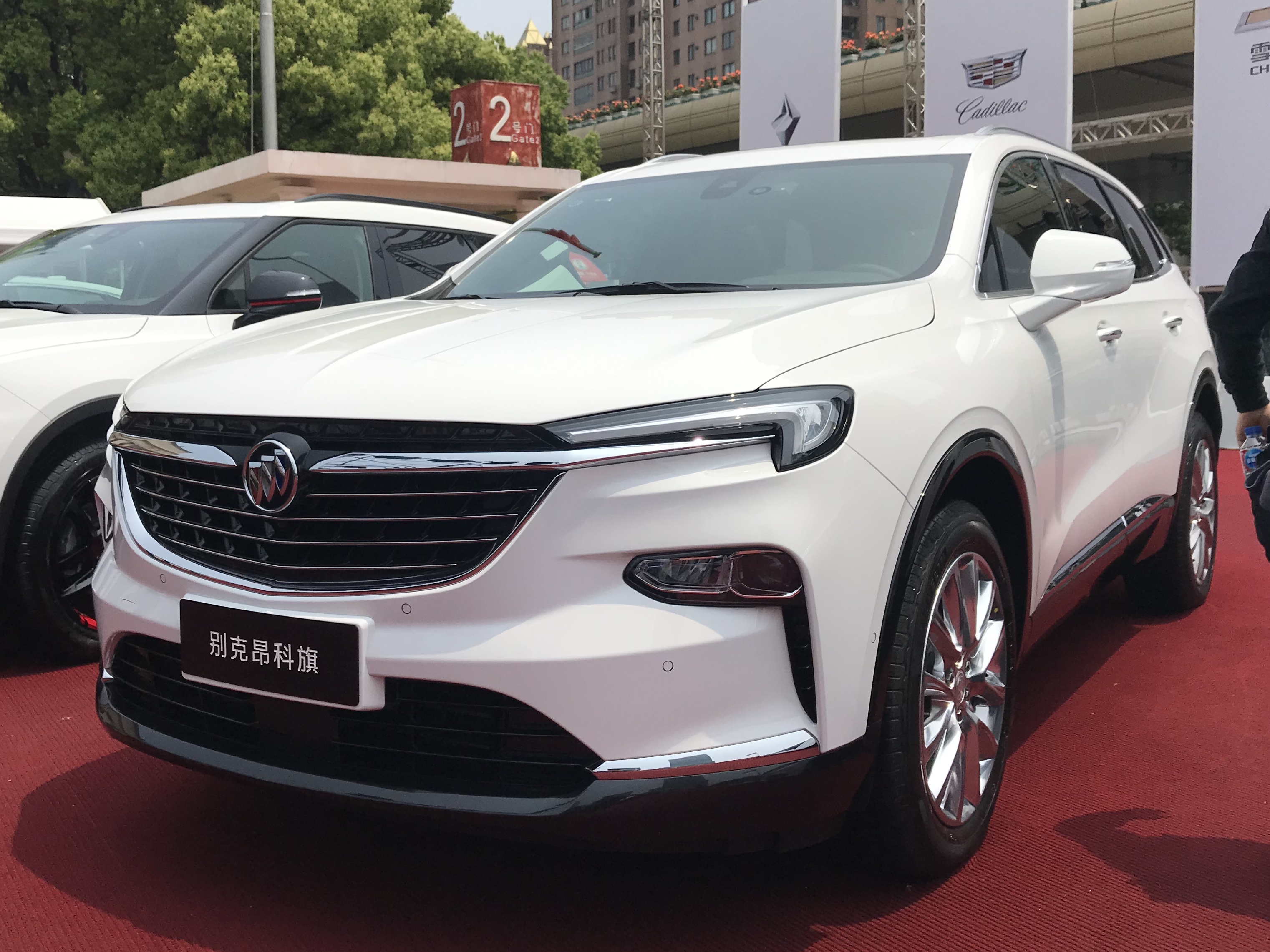

Overview
- Production: 2019–2025
- Model years: 2020–2025
- Assembly: China: Jinqiao, Pudong, Shanghai (SAIC-GM)

Body and chassis
- Platform: GM C1XX short wheelbase platform
- Related: Cadillac XT6; Chevrolet Blazer

Powertrain
- Engine: 2.0 L LSY I4 (gasoline)
- Transmission: 9-speed automatic

Dimensions
- Wheelbase: 112.7 in (2,863 mm)
- Length: 196.1 in (4,981 mm)
- Width: 76.9 in (1,953 mm)
- Height: 68.2 in (1,732 mm)
- Curb weight: 4,140–4,520 lb (1,880–2,050 kg)

On October 22, 2019, Buick unveiled the Chinese-market Enclave. It is a "mid-size plus" version of the Enclave which utilizes GM's C1 short wheelbase platform. It went on sale in that region in late 2019. While it has the similar features as the full-size North American Enclave, the Chinese version is shorter with a design different from its counterpart; there are no plans to make it available in North America. Buick planned to name the Chinese version "Envoy" (a name previously used on a GMC midsize SUV in North America from 1998 to 2007) but elected to use the Enclave name instead.

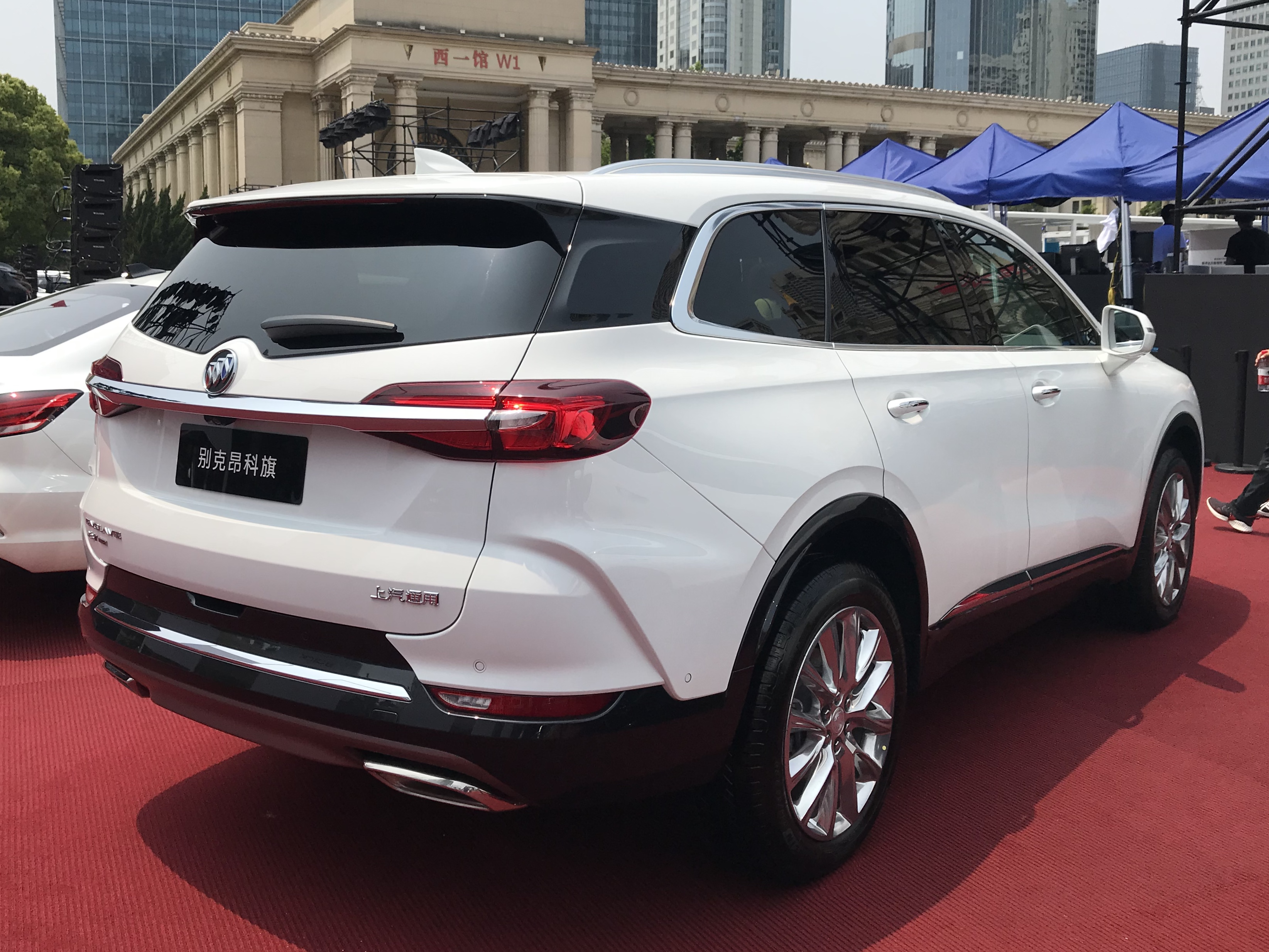
Rear view

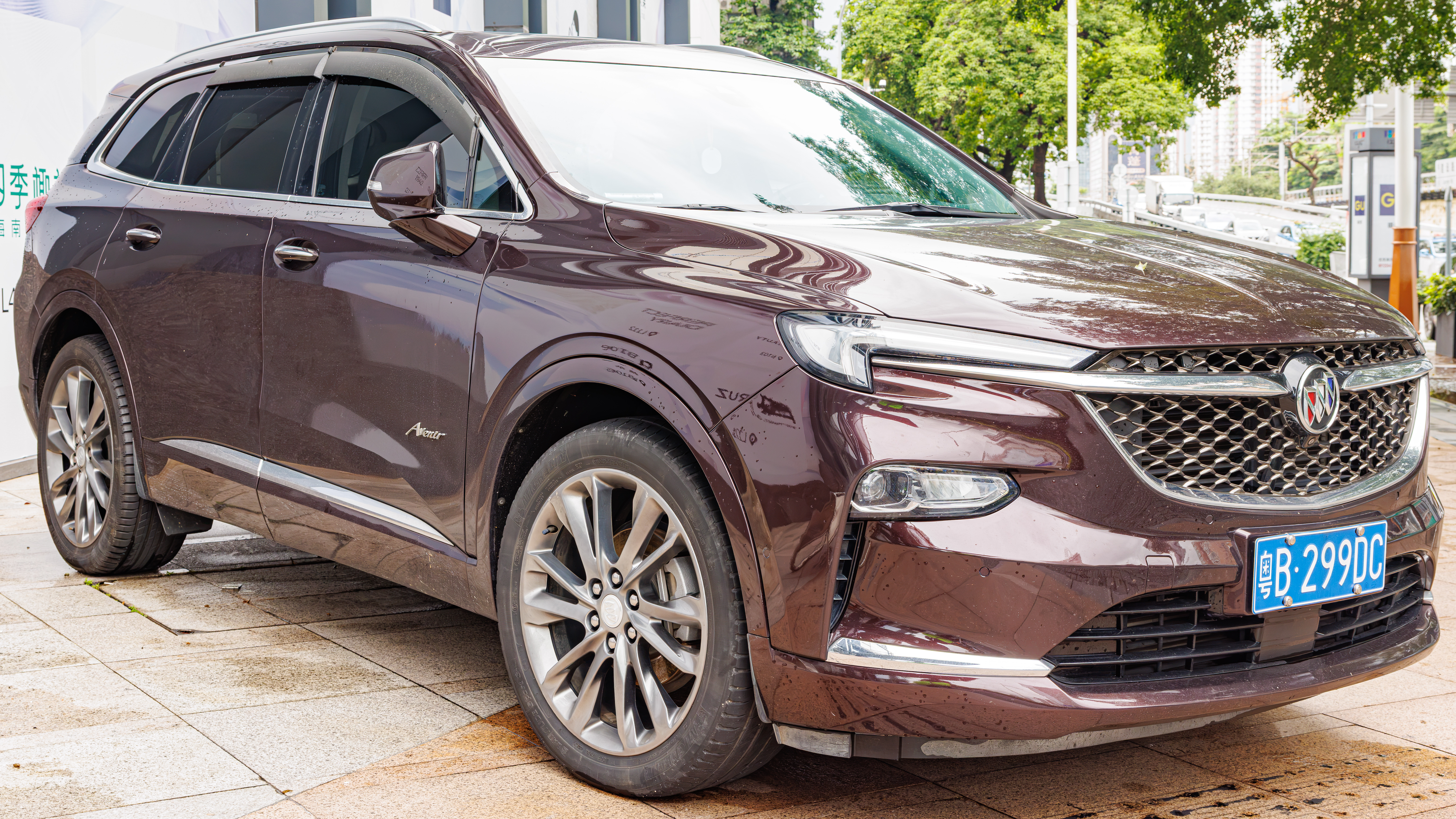
Buick Enclave Avenir

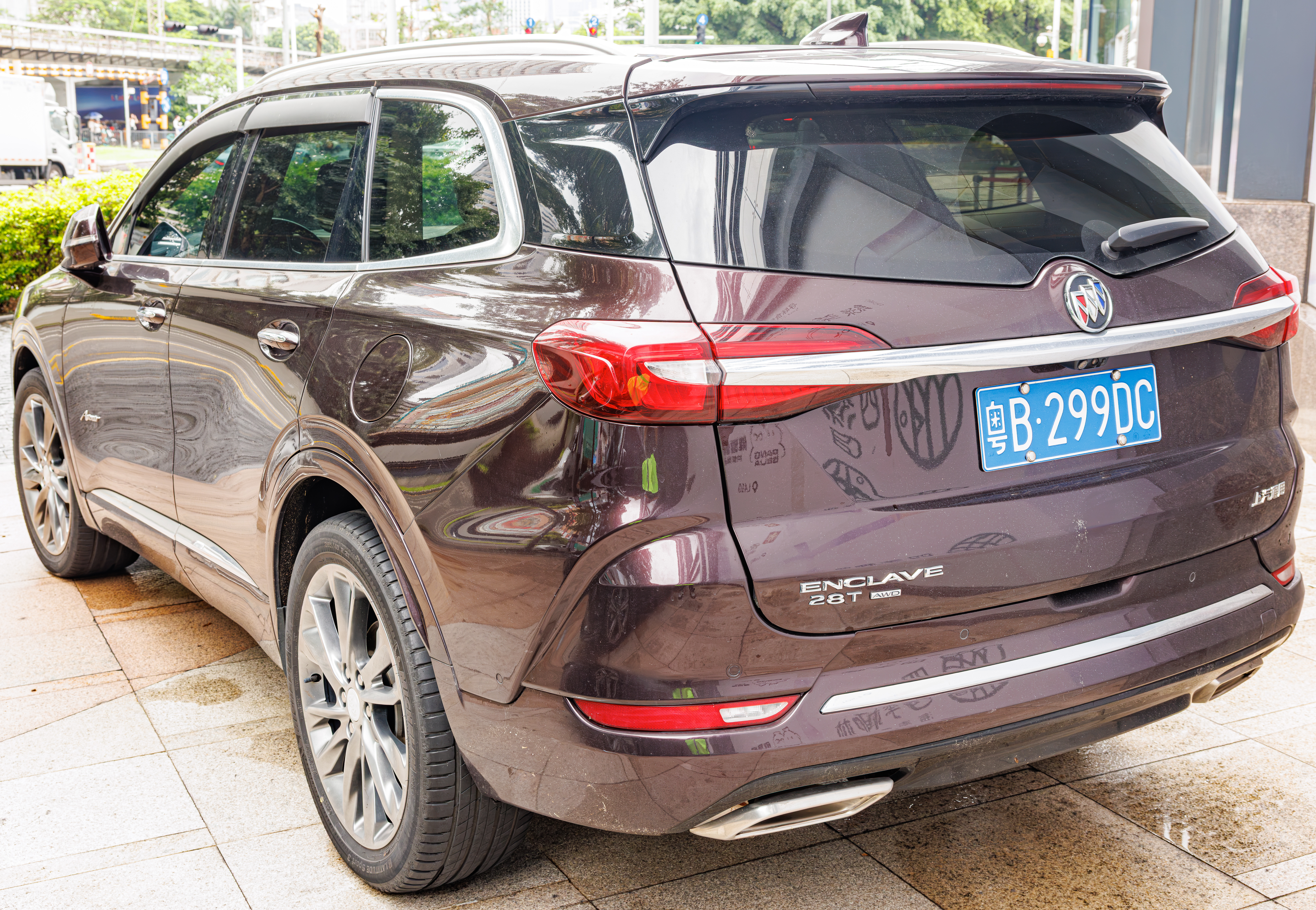
Rear view

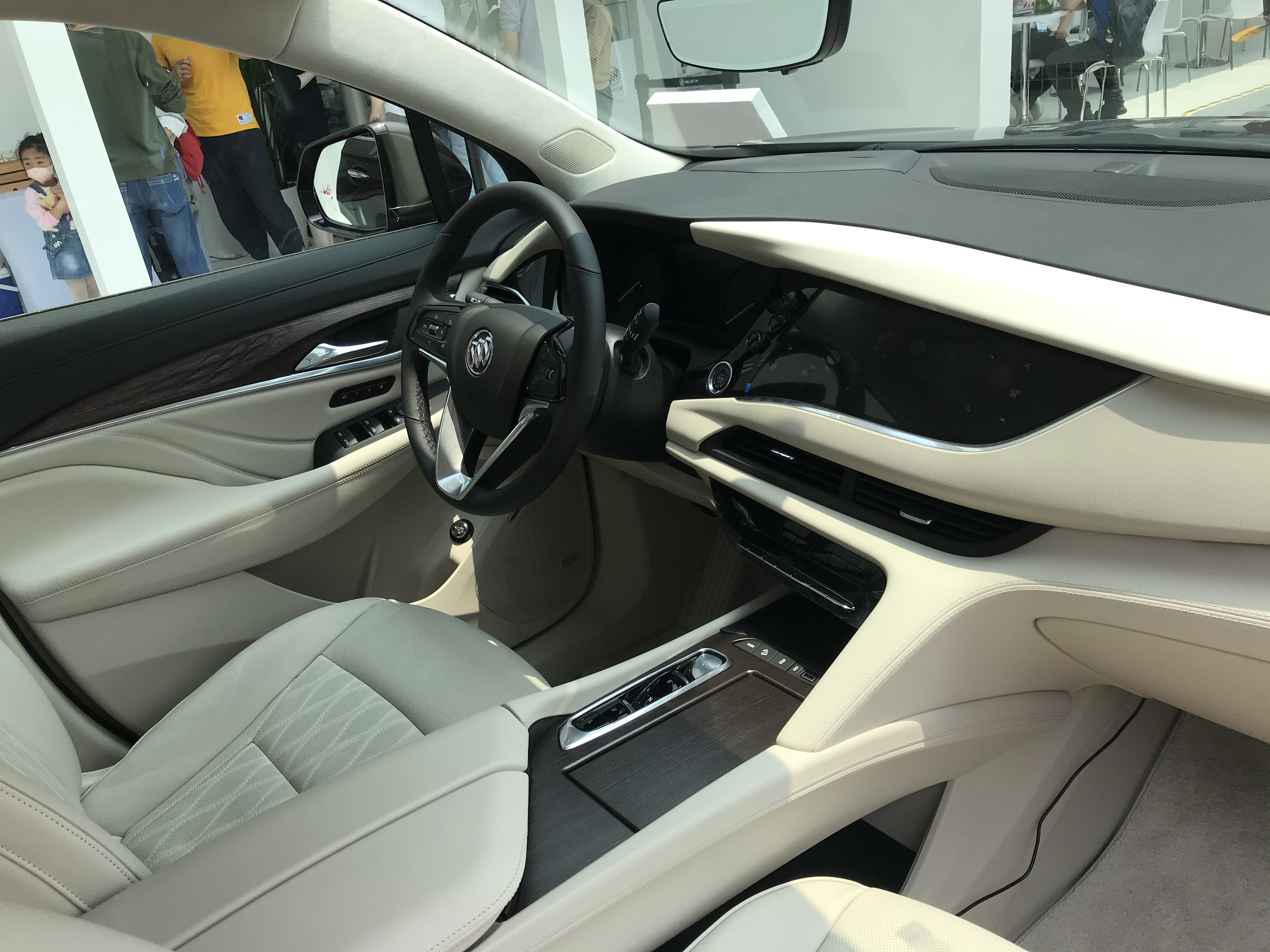
Interior

The Chinese Enclave features GM's Electronic Precision Shift technology, and is equipped exclusively with a turbocharged 2.0L LSY engine that makes 233 horsepower (174 kW; 236 PS), mated to the new GM nine-speed automatic transmission.

Enclave was removed from the Buick China website in December 2025.

== Third generation (2025) ==
Third generation
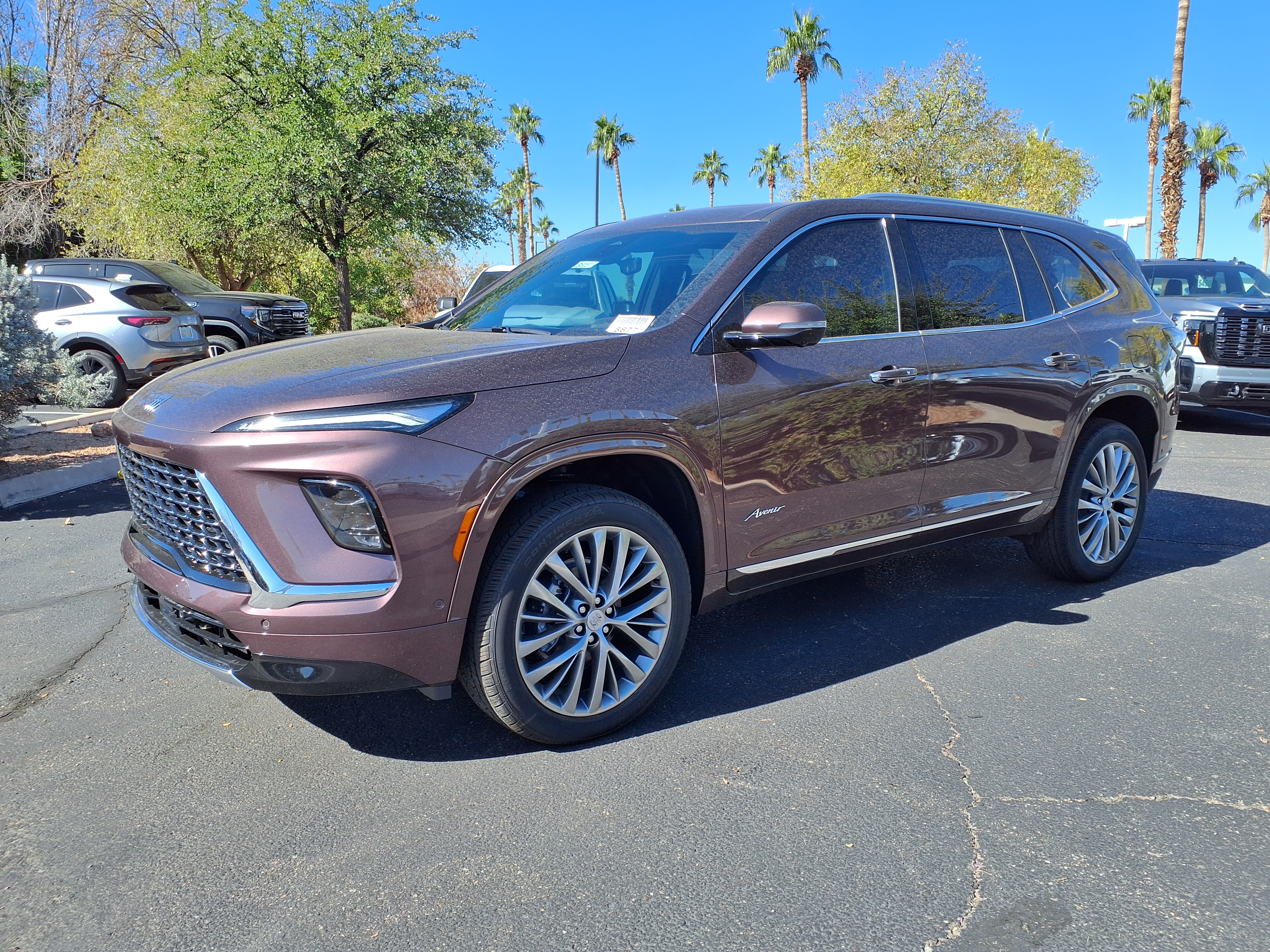
- 2026 Buick Enclave Avenir

Overview
- Production: 2024–present
- Model years: 2025–present
- Assembly: United States: Lansing, Michigan (Lansing Delta Township Assembly)

Body and chassis
- Platform: GM VSS-S (C1XX-2)
- Related: Cadillac XT5; Chevrolet Traverse; GMC Acadia

Powertrain
- Engine: 2.5 L LK0 turbo I4 (gasoline)
- Power output: 328 hp (245 kW; 333 PS)
- Transmission: 8-speed automatic

Dimensions
- Wheelbase: 120.9 in (3,071 mm)
- Length: 207.6 in (5,273 mm)
- Width: 79.6 in (2,022 mm)
- Height: 71.0 in (1,803 mm)
- Curb weight: 4,359–4,685 lb (1,977–2,125 kg)

General Motors unveiled the third generation Enclave on April 9, 2024. It is available in three trim levels: Preferred, Sport Touring and Avenir.

The exterior styling of the Enclave was inspired by the Buick Wildcat EV concept car. The Enclave features signature winged LED DRLs, checkmark-style LED headlights and cross-car full width LED taillights. There is a walk-up lighting animation feature on the Avenir trim.

The interior has a floating center console with an ultra-wide 30-inch display for both the instrument cluster and touchscreen infotainment system - the largest screen in its class.

All Enclave trim levels are powered by a turbocharged 2.5L inline-four gasoline engine producing 328 hp (245 kW) and 326 lb⋅ft (442 N⋅m) of torque paired to a 8-speed automatic transmission.

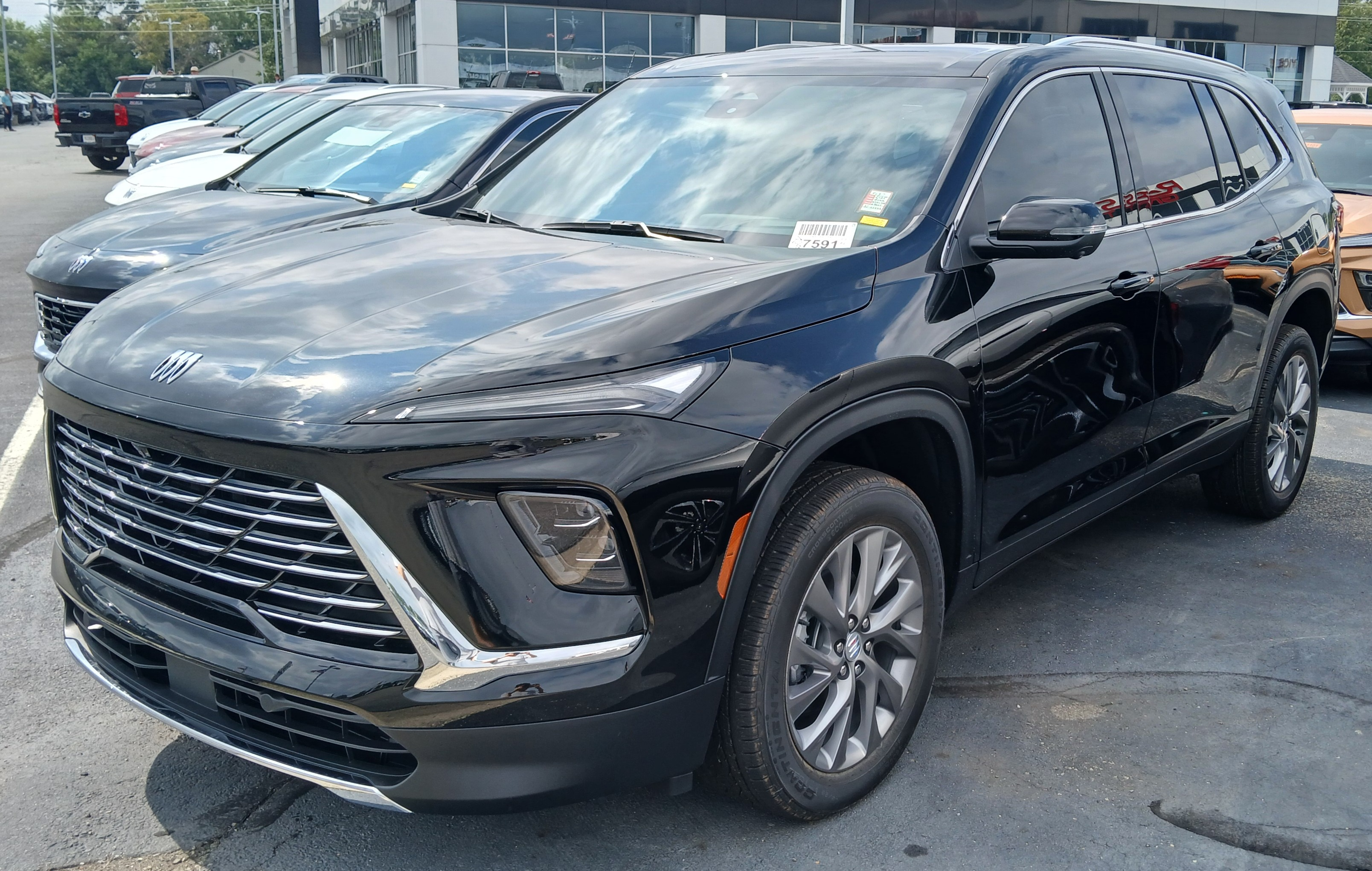
2025 Buick Enclave Preferred

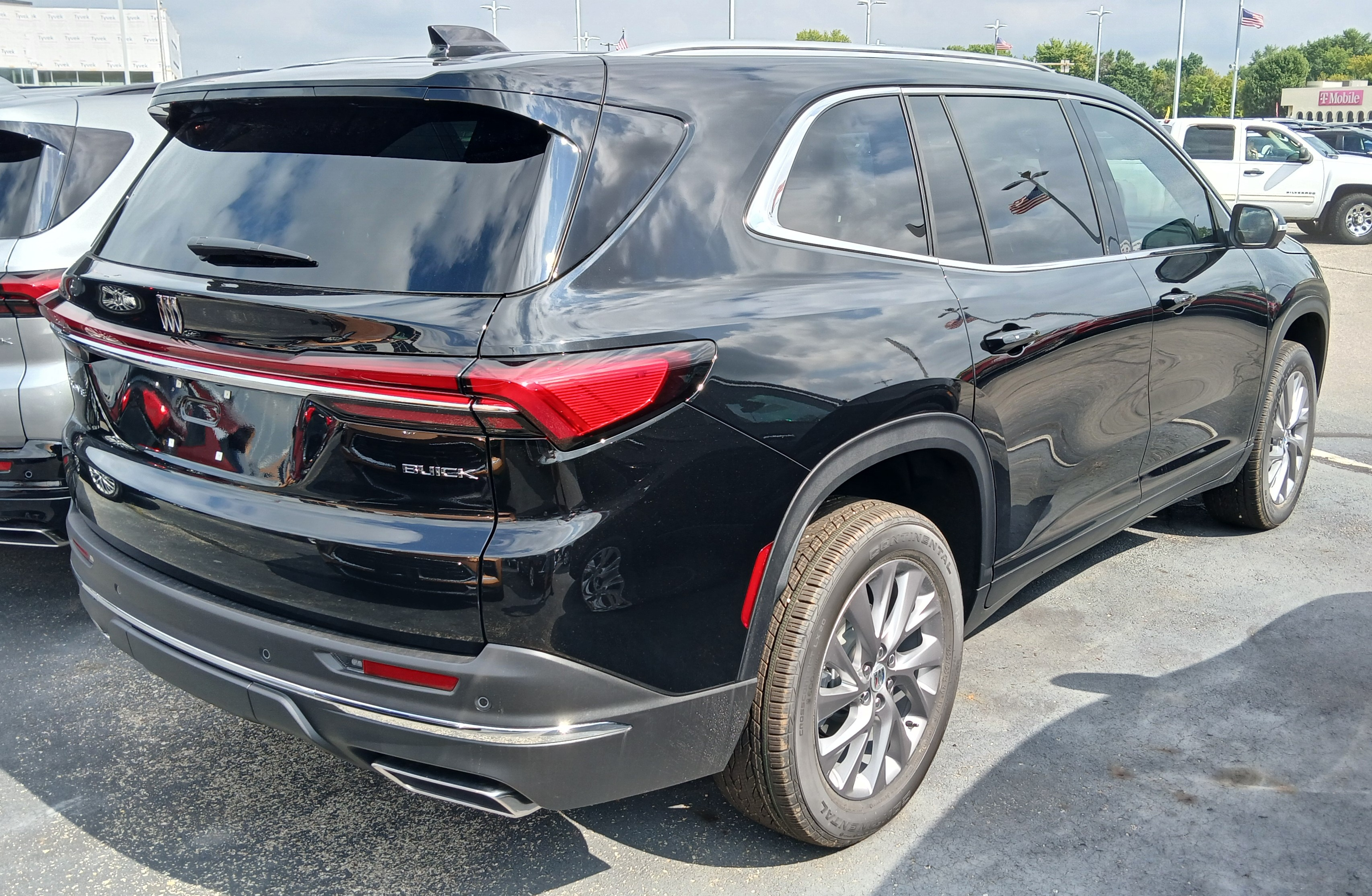
Enclave Preferred rear

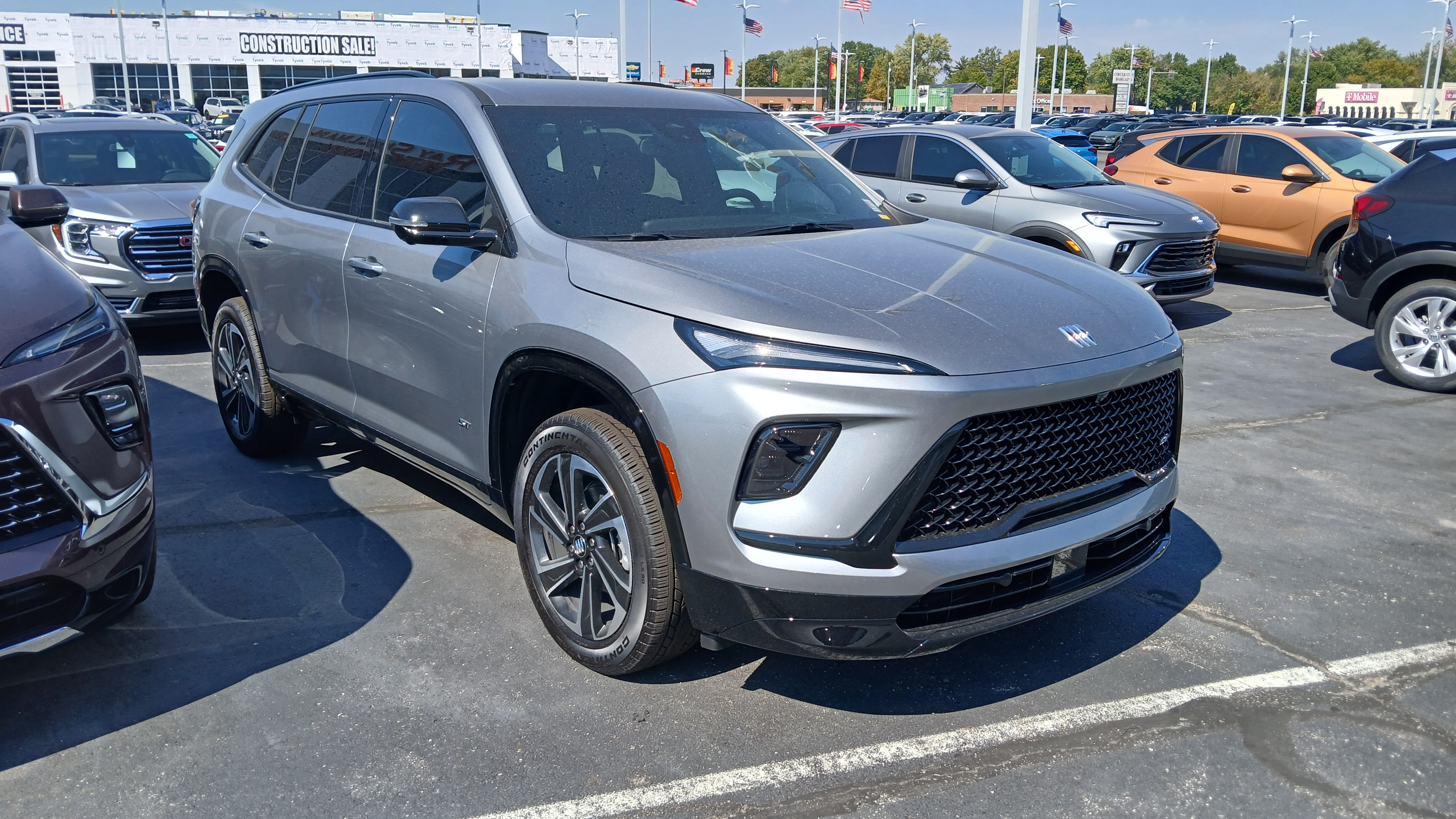
2025 Buick Enclave ST

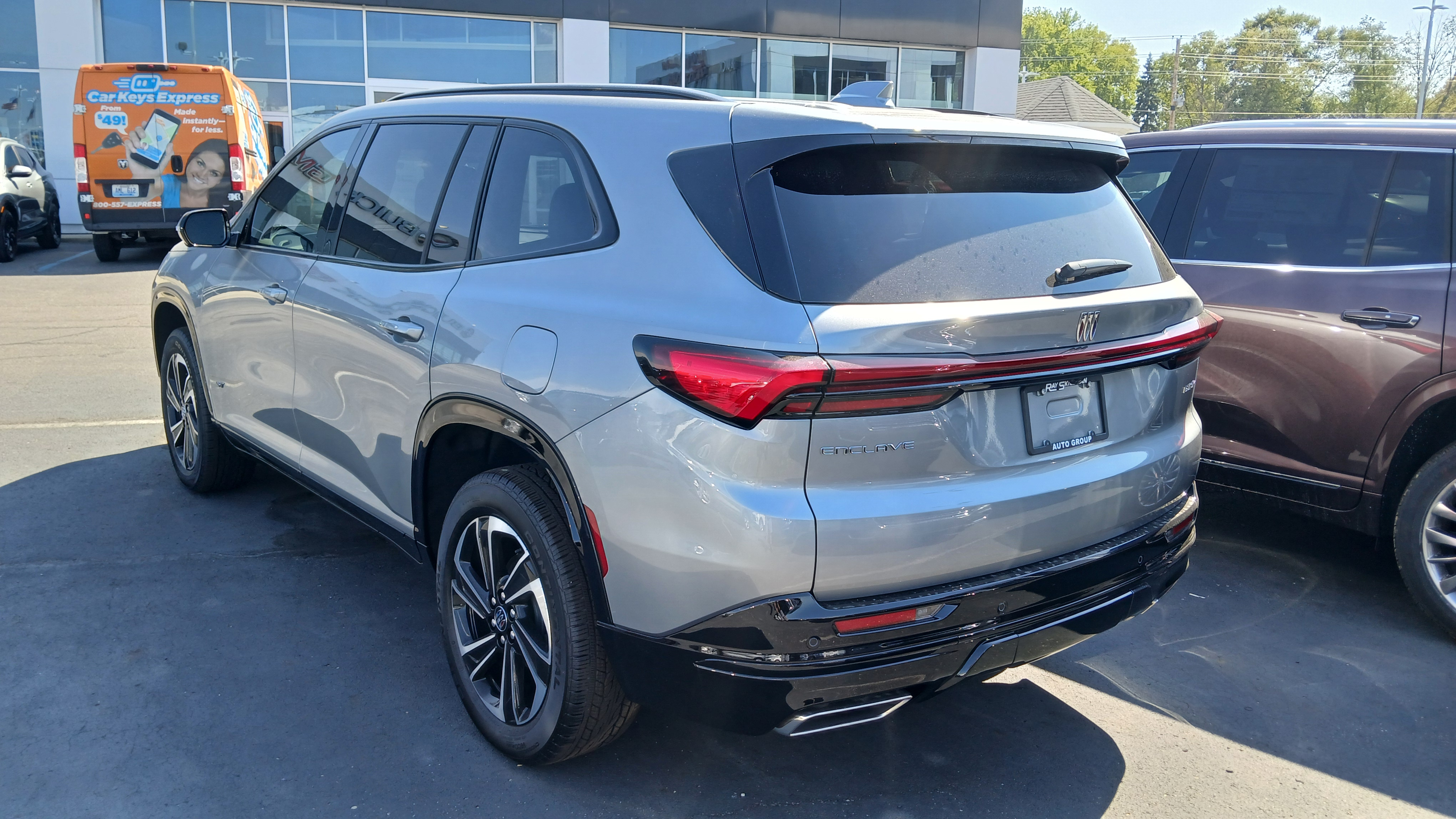
Enclave ST rear

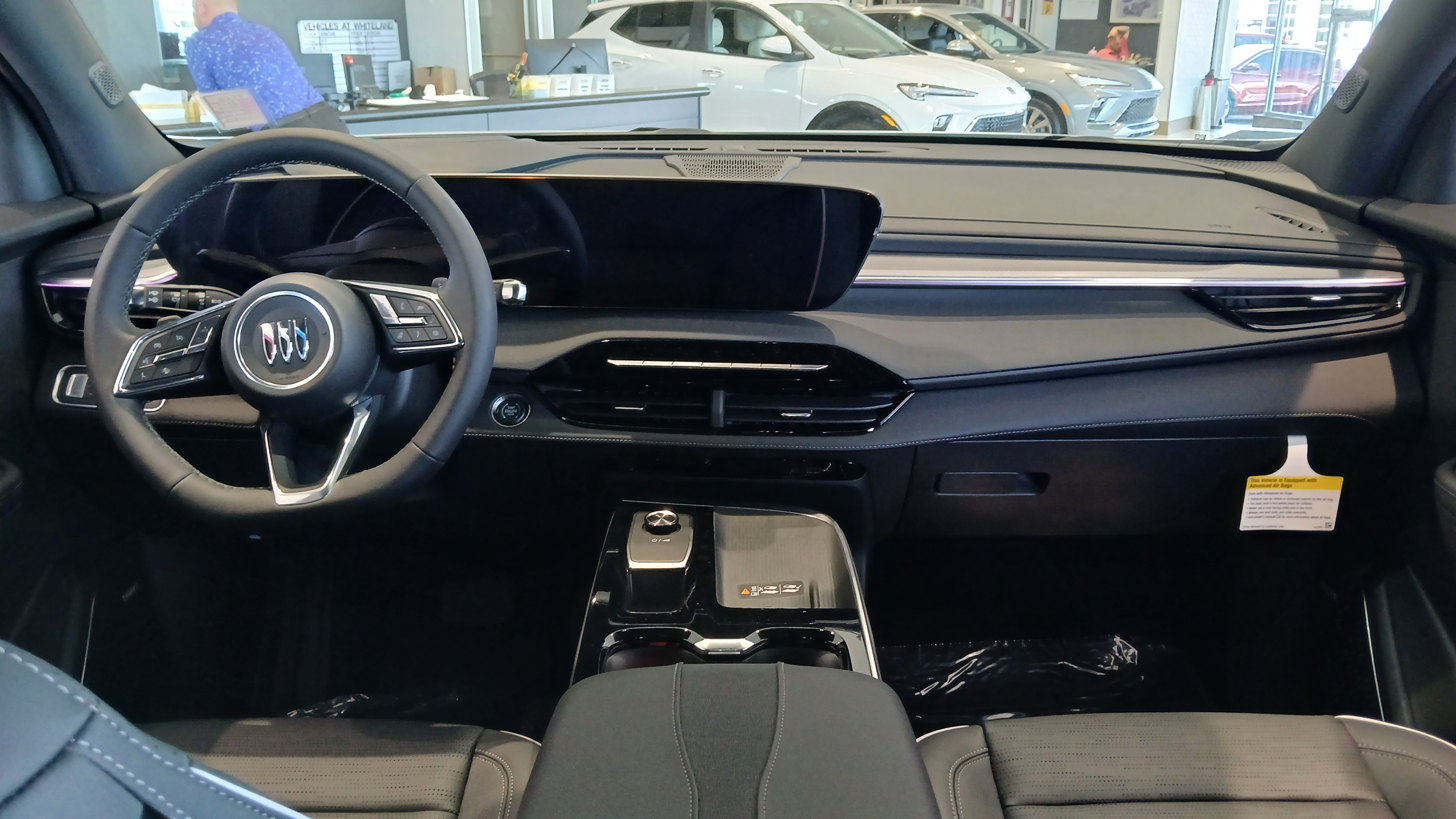
Interior

=== Safety ===
The 2025 Enclave was awarded "Top Safety Pick+ by IIHS. The Enclave is the first Buick product to feature Super Cruise hands free advanced driver assistance system (ADAS), which includes Driver Attention Assist and Enhanced Automatic Park Assist and a digital rear-view camera mirror (on the Avenir trim). Other available driving assistance system features are Blind Zone Steering Assist, Departure Warning, Intersection Automatic Emergency Braking and Lane Keep Assist.

IIHS scores (2025)
Small overlap front	Good	
Moderate overlap front (updated test)	Good	
Side (updated test)	Good	
Headlights	Good	Marginal
Front crash prevention: vehicle-to-vehicle 2.0	Good	
Front crash prevention: vehicle-to-pedestrian	Acceptable	
Seatbelt reminders	Good	

== Sales ==
Calendar year	United States	Canada	China
2007	29,286	2,557	—N/a
2008	44,706	4,994	—N/a
2009	43,150	3,854	—N/a
2010	55,426	4,135	—N/a
2011	58,392	3,294	—N/a
2012	56,703	3,283	—N/a
2013	60,534	3,286	—N/a
2014	62,300	3,528	—N/a
2015	62,081	3,361	—N/a
2016	52,028	3,632	—N/a
2017	48,564	3,501	—N/a
2018	49,647	3,511	—N/a
2019	51,156	2,934	5,565
2020	38,480	1,773	22,824
2021	41,962	2,169	33,601
2022	30,533	1,775	21,305
2023	39,411	3,195	12,199
2024	26,400	2,133	2,537
2025	39,754	3,023	1,087

== Awards ==
The Enclave received the Best New SUV/CUV (over C$60,000) from the AJAC in 2008.
