= GM Ultra Engine =

Ultra was the codename for General Motors' next-generation family of DOHC V8 engines that was being developed to replace the Northstar as the V8 engine of choice for GM's premium vehicles. There is very little information on the engine's specifications currently available, however its lowest displacement would presumably have been similar to the Northstar's, (with higher-displacement versions probable as well), and it would very likely have incorporated technologies from the High Feature V6 family, including continuously variable valve timing on both intake and exhaust ports, as well as provision for gasoline direct injection. These engines would probably have been adaptable for both longitudinal and transverse applications (the latter would have been used by the rumored V8-powered versions of the Lambda crossover SUVs).

Despite previously revealing plans to allocate production to the Tonawanda Engine plant, GM canceled development of this engine in January 2008. The 2013 Cadillac Elmiraj concept had been confirmed to be powered by a twin-turbo 4.5 L V8 that was based on the twin-turbo 3.6 L V6 engine.

== See also ==
- List of GM engines
- Northstar engine series
- GM High Feature engine
- Cadillac twin-turbo V8
