= Opel GTC =

Opel GTC Concept
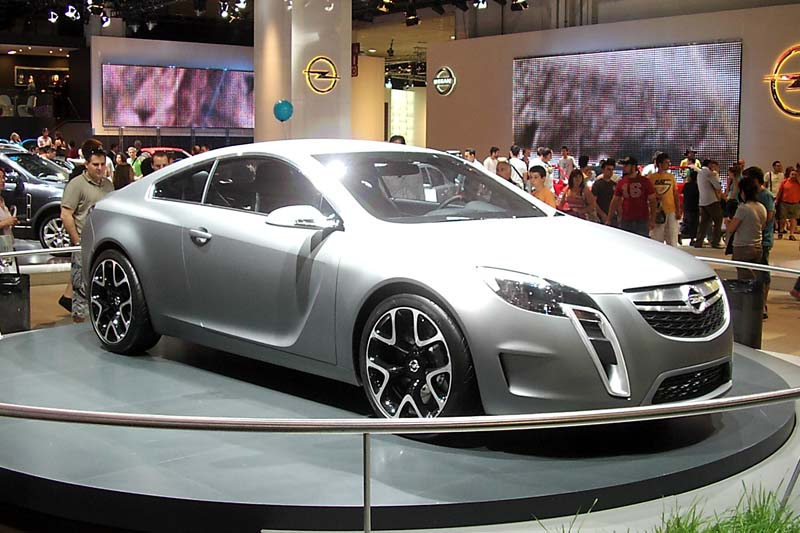

Overview
- Manufacturer: Opel
- Production: 2007 (concept car only)

Body and chassis
- Class: Grand tourer
- Body style: 2-door 2+2 coupé
- Layout: front engine all-wheel drive

Powertrain
- Engine: 2.8 L GM LP9 V6 Turbo
- Transmission: 6-speed manual

Dimensions
- Length: 190.2 in (4,831 mm)
- Width: 73.5 in (1,867 mm)
- Height: 56.4 in (1,433 mm)

The Opel Gran Turismo Coupé Concept, abbreviated as Opel GTC Concept, is a concept car that was manufactured by Opel and designed to be a coupé version of the Opel Vectra C. The GTC premiered at the 77th Geneva Motor Show in 2007. The Opel GTC is a grand tourer.

== Specifications ==
The GTC is powered by a turbocharged 2.8 L (171 cid) V6 engine from the High Feature family, which was also used in the standard Vectra C, but tuned in the GTC to produce 300 hp (224 kW) and 295 lb⋅ft (400 N⋅m) of torque. The base and floorpan came from the platform General Motors Epsilon II but were modified for all wheel drive to apply the power effectively.

The car was capable of 0 to 100 km/h (62 mph) in 6.0 seconds, and having a top speed of 250 km/h (155 mph).

== Influence ==
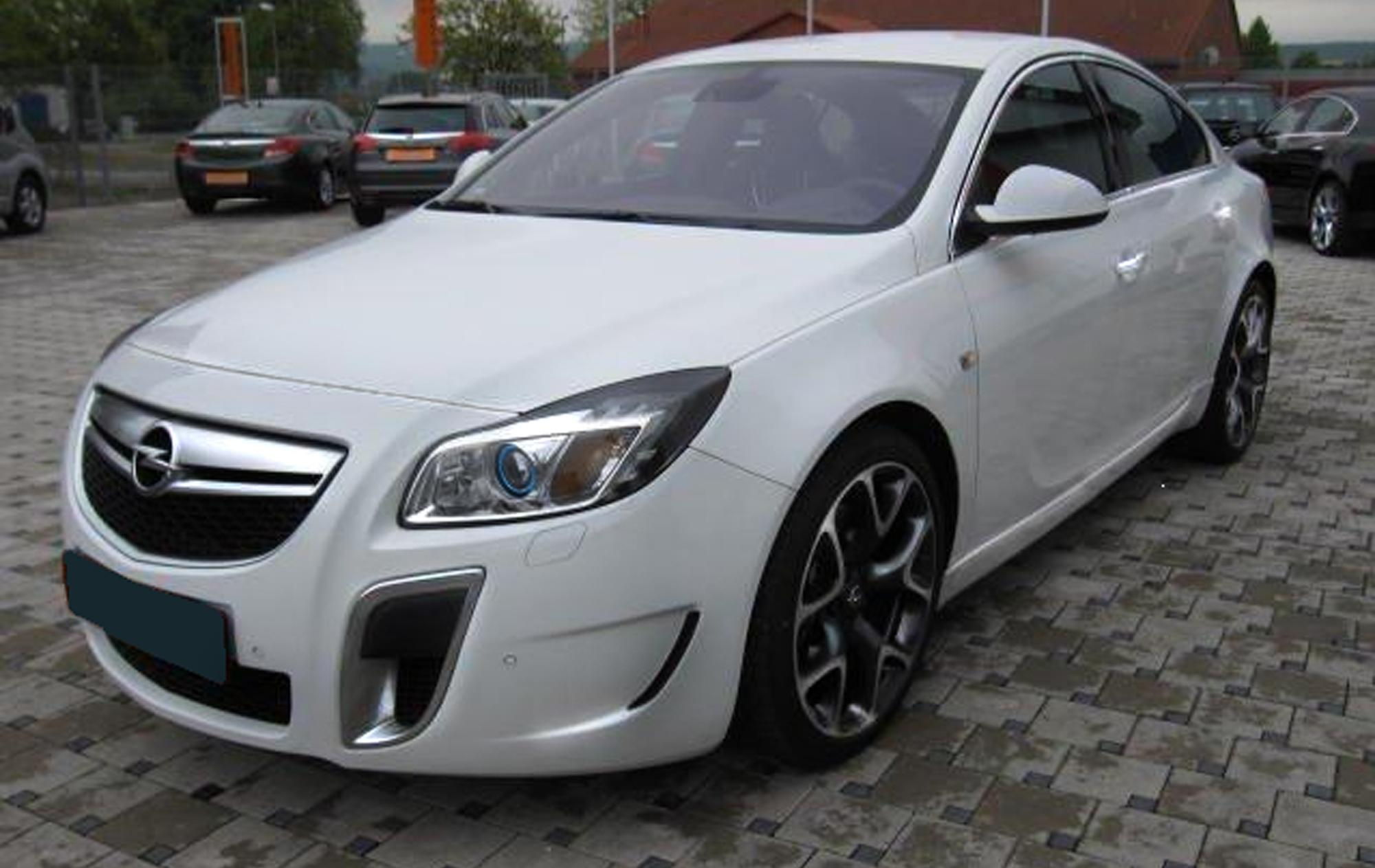
Opel Insignia OPC (2010)

The Opel Vectra C went out of production in July 2008. Design cues of the Opel GTC were then used on the Opel Insignia, an upmarket replacement for the Vectra which was launched in October 2008. The closest resemblance can be found with OPC versions of the Insignia A. However, no coupé version of the Insignia was ever made available. The front bumper was also an inspiration to the Opel Ampera, a car based on the Chevrolet Volt.
