= Saturn Outlook =

Full-size crossover SUV

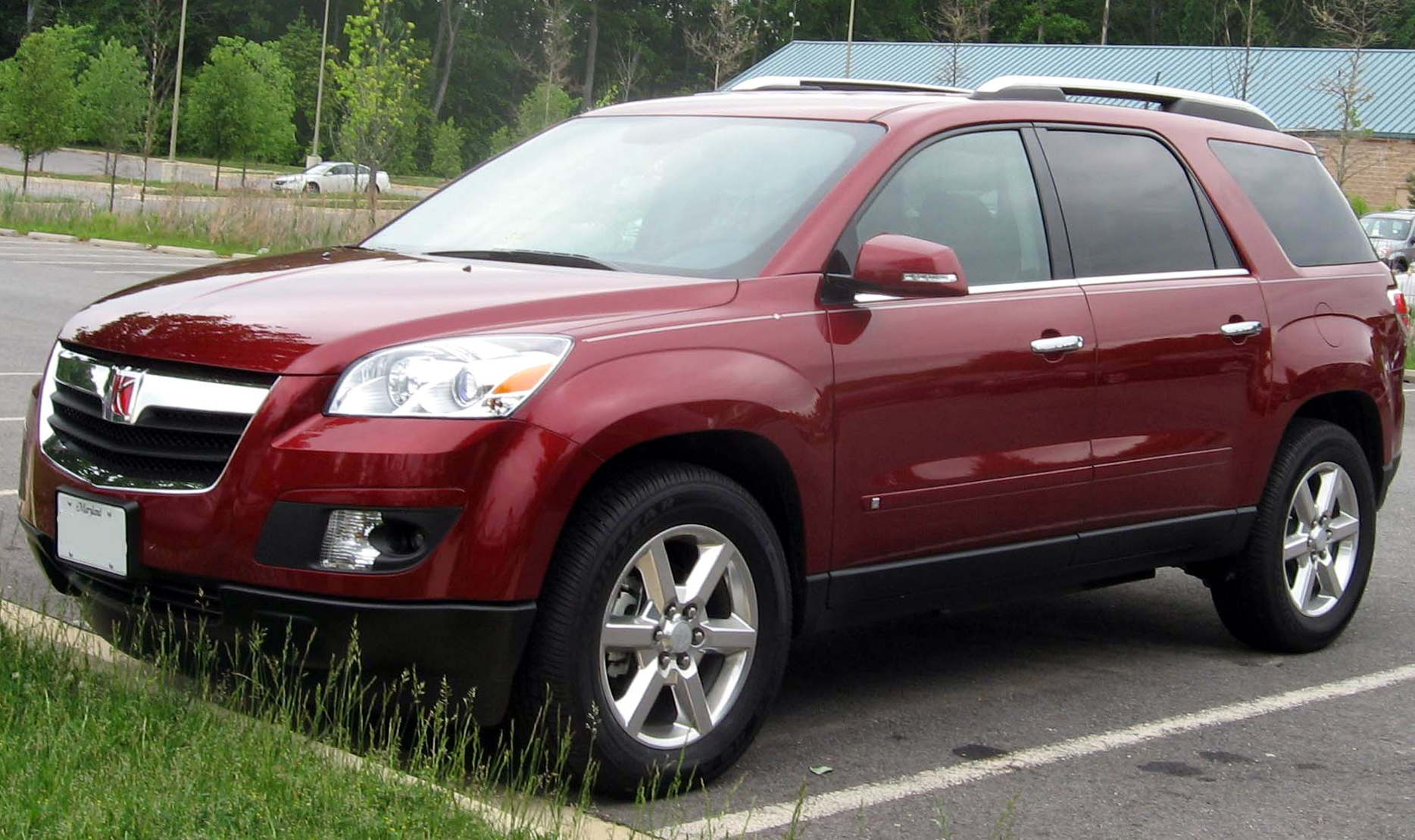

Overview
- Manufacturer: General Motors
- Production: 2006–2010
- Model years: 2007–2010
- Assembly: United States: Lansing, Michigan (Lansing Delta Township Assembly)
- Designer: Bryan Nesbitt

Body and chassis
- Class: Full-size crossover SUV
- Body style: 4-door SUV
- Layout: Transverse front-engine, front-wheel drive / all-wheel drive
- Platform: GM Lambda platform/GMT966 (Series GMT960)
- Related: Buick Enclave; GMC Acadia; Chevrolet Traverse

Powertrain
- Engine: 3.6 L LY7 V6; 3.6 L LLT V6
- Transmission: 6-speed 6T70 automatic

Dimensions
- Wheelbase: 118.9 in (3,020 mm)
- Length: 200.7 in (5,098 mm)
- Width: 78.2 in (1,986 mm)
- Height: 69.9 in (1,775 mm)

Chronology
- Predecessor: Saturn Relay

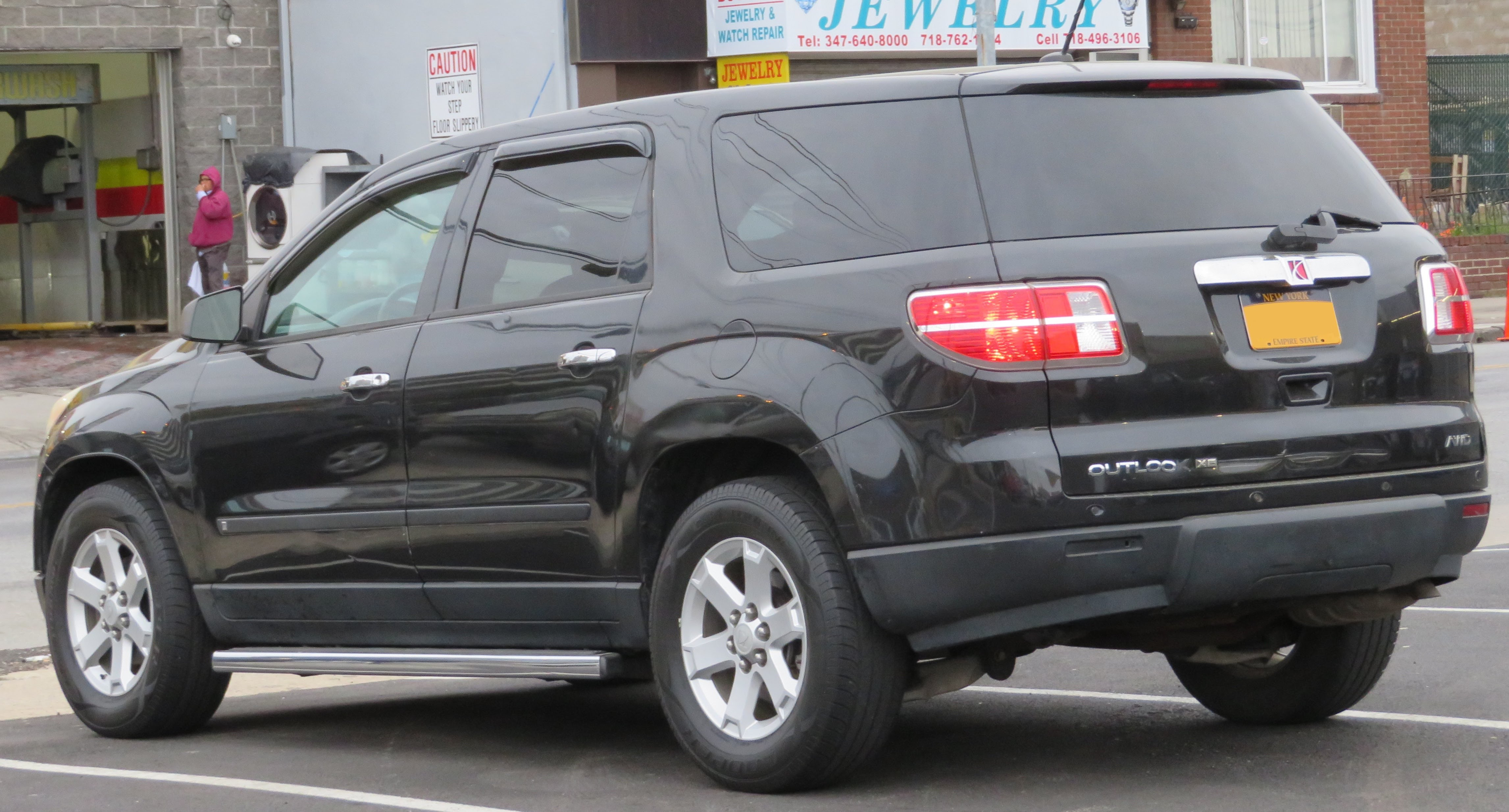
Saturn Outlook rear

The Saturn Outlook is a full-size crossover SUV that debuted at the New York International Auto Show, and was based on the GM Lambda platform, which it shared with the Buick Enclave, Chevrolet Traverse and GMC Acadia. The Outlook went on sale in 2006 as a 2007 model. The Outlook featured the lowest sticker price among GM's Lambda crossover SUVs, slotting below the GMC Acadia and Buick Enclave. The Chevrolet Traverse would ultimately take the place of the Outlook as the family-oriented model following the introduction of the Traverse for the 2009 model year, and the demise of the Outlook, along with the entire Saturn brand in 2010, with the 2010 model year having several hundred models built to use up extra parts.

== Driveline ==
The Outlook was powered by the 3.6 L V6 DOHC 24-valve HFV6 engine with Variable Valve Timing, available with either single or dual exhaust. Both versions use the Hydra-Matic 6T75 six-speed automatic transmission, and available with either front-wheel drive or all-wheel drive.

| Year | Exhaust | Engine | Power | Torque | Transmission |
|---|---|---|---|---|---|
| 2007–2008 | Single | 3.6 L LY7 V6 | 270 hp (198 kW) | 248 lb·ft (331 N·m) | 6-speed 6T75 |
| 2007–2008 | Dual | 3.6 L LY7 V6 | 275 hp (199 kW) | 251 lb·ft (335 N·m) | 6-speed 6T75 |
| 2009 | Single | 3.6 L LLT V6 | 281 hp (210 kW) | 266 lb·ft (361 N·m) | 6-speed 6T75 |
| 2009 | Dual | 3.6 L LLT V6 | 288 hp (215 kW) | 270 lb·ft (366 N·m) | 6-speed 6T75 |

== Yearly American sales ==
| Year | Sales |
|---|---|
| 2006 | 144 |
| 2007 | 34,748 |
| 2008 | 25,340 |
| 2009 | 13,115 |
| 2010 | 3,637 |

== Trim levels ==
The Outlook came in two different trim levels, the base model XE, and the top-of-the-line trim XR. The XE came with a single exhaust, which makes 270 hp at 6600 rpm and 248 lb-ft of torque at 3200 rpm, while the XR came with a dual exhaust, which makes 275 hp at 6600 rpm and 251 lb-ft of torque at 3200 rpm, these models would both receive a minor power boost with the 2009 model year that came with the LLT engine. Both models came standard with front-wheel-drive, while the all-wheel-drive models were sold as an optional extra.

== Seating configuration ==
The Outlook can seat eight in a three-row setting. The front row consists of two bucket seats, and the second row is available as either a 60/40 split-folding three-passenger bench seat or two individual "captain chairs." The third row is a 60/40 split-folding three-passenger bench seat.

In the press release accompanying the Outlook's launch, GM emphasized the "industry first" SmartSlide second row. In case of both bench seat or captain chairs, the seat cushion flips forward while the seat is being slid forward, which allows for "compression" of the space used by the seat in the foremost position. If the third seat is folded, this allows for expansion of the cargo area. The system also allows for fore-aft adjustment of the middle seat to change the spacing between the second and third-row seats for more legroom.

== Production ==
The Outlook, along with the other Lambda-based vehicles, was built in the Delta Township Assembly plant near Lansing, Michigan. Production on the Saturn Outlook and its twin the GMC Acadia had both begun on May 24, 2006 for the 2007 model year.

In December 2006, all production and sales of the Outlook (and the GMC Acadia) were temporarily stopped due to the engine mounts not having holes drilled to release accumulated water, as well as an issue with potentially faulty rivets in the load floor just forward of the rear hatch. The assembly process was quickly adjusted, and dealerships were told to fix the problems themselves before offering the Outlook (or the Acadia) for sale again. Sales resumed within days of the notice.

Production of the Outlook was halted in late 2009. However, in February 2010 GM resumed production of the Outlook to use up remaining parts prior to the closing of the Saturn division. It is not known how or where they were sold. 3,637 2010 model year Outlooks were built, 2,507 of them were assembled in the calendar year of 2010.

Following its discontinuation, the bodyshell of the Outlook was revived as a mid-cycle refresh of the 2013 GMC Acadia. The bodyshell of the 2013 Acadia was mostly unchanged from the Saturn Outlook, GM had only made changes to the 2013 Acadia where necessary.

== Crash test ratings ==
National Highway Traffic Safety Administration (NHTSA):

Frontal: Side:

The Outlook was an Insurance Institute for Highway Safety Top Safety Pick for 2008 and 2009.
