= General Motors Epsilon platform =

GM Epsilon platform
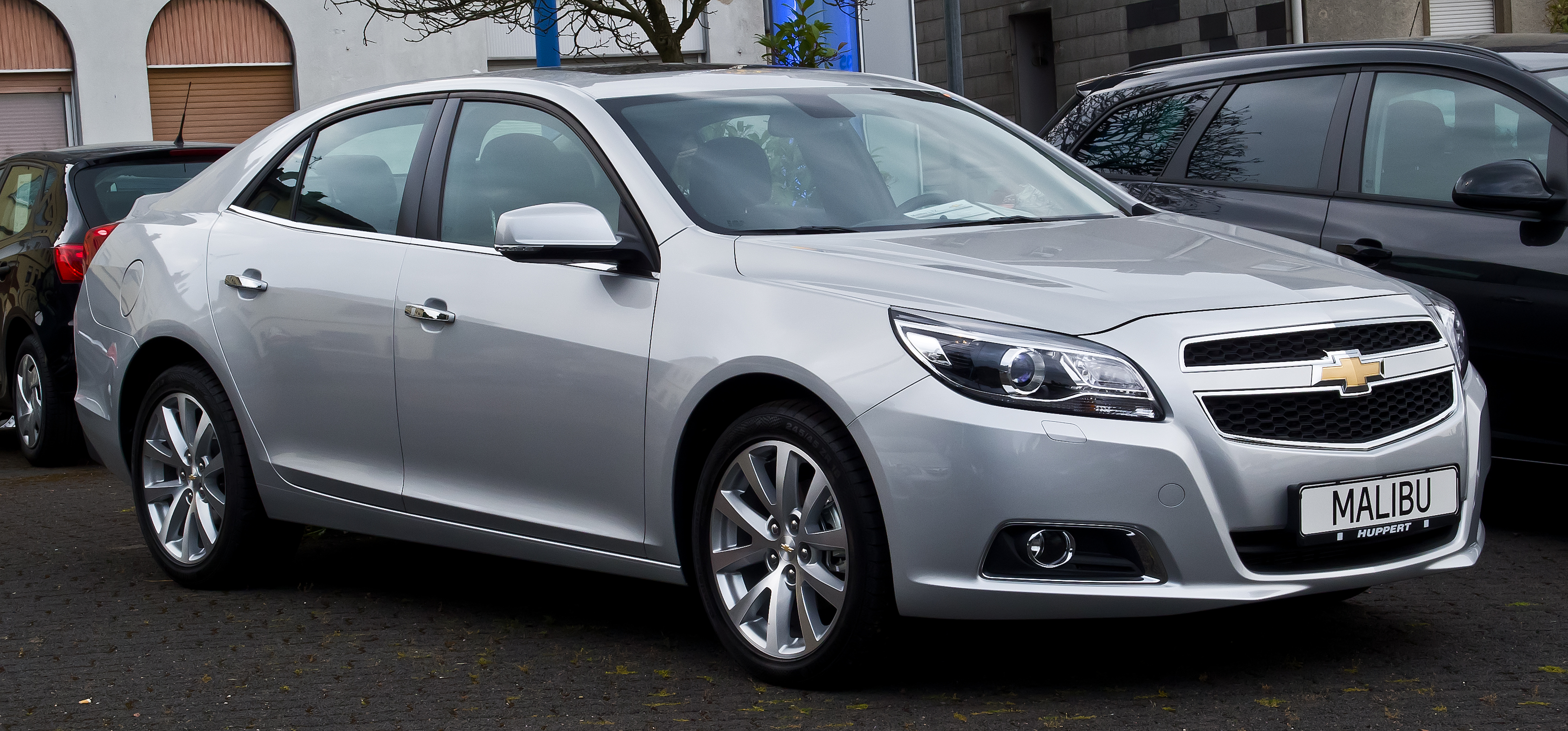

Overview
- Manufacturer: General Motors
- Production: 2002–present

Body and chassis
- Class: Compact executive car (D); Mid-size (D); Large car (E)
- Layout: Transverse front engine, front-wheel drive/all-wheel drive
- Body styles: 2-door Convertible; 4-door Sedan/Saloon; 5-door Hatchback/Liftback; 5-door Station wagon/Estate/Caravan; 5-door Multi-purpose vehicle
- Vehicles: Buick Lacrosse/Alpheon; Cadillac BLS; Cadillac XTS; Chevrolet Classic; Chevrolet Impala; Chevrolet/Holden Malibu; Chevrolet Malibu Maxx; Fiat Croma; Opel Insignia/Buick Regal; Opel Signum; Opel Vectra; Pontiac G6; Roewe 950; Saab 9-3; Saab 9-5; Saturn Aura
- Related: GM Alpha platform

Powertrain
- Engines: Gasoline engines: Ecotec I4; Ecotec Family 1 I4; GM 54° V6; High Value V6; High Feature V6; Diesel engines: Multijet I4, I5; Family B I4; Dmax V6

Chronology
- Predecessor: GM N platform GM2900 platform GM W platform GM G platform GM Zeta platform
- Successor: GM VSS-F

Epsilon is General Motors' mid-size front-wheel drive automobile platform. The architecture was a multi-division project of GM North America, Opel and Saab, and debuted in the 2002 Opel Vectra and 2003 Saab 9-3. Since this platform falls squarely in the center of the worldwide automobile market, GM plans to produce a great many Epsilon vehicles with over a dozen variations. As of 2005, it was GM's highest volume worldwide platform. Even after the dissolution of the GM/Fiat partnership, both companies retain the rights to continue developing Epsilon-derived models.

A total of 16 different models have made use of the GM Epsilon platform, some of which remain in production 24 years after the platform debuted.

== Features ==
GM's Epsilon platform replaced the N platform in the US, and replaced the GM2900 platform elsewhere. Vehicles of this platform generally carry the symbol "Z" in the fourth digit of their VINs.

When the platform debuted, there was talk of an "Epsilon Wide" derivative, which was supposed to have provided the underpinnings for the Buick LaCrosse and Saab 9-5. However, the program was cancelled and the LaCrosse was put on the W platform, and the 9-5 was given a quick refresh for the 2006 model year.

The Epsilon platform is a midsize front-driver promising a 200 percent improvement in rigidity, with aluminum suspension components—MacPherson struts in front and a four-link independent arrangement in the rear, and four-wheel disc brakes. Many of the Epsilon vehicles use the Ecotec Inline-four engines and both the High Value and High Feature V6 engines.

The refreshed 2008 SAAB 9-3 debuted with an advanced version of all-wheel-drive it dubbed XWD, finally giving a definitive answer to rumors about the platform's ability to support AWD, which had been around since the debut of the platform.

The Lambda and Theta Premium crossover platforms are derived from Epsilon.

=== Vehicles ===
Vehicles based on the Epsilon I platform:

- Regular
  - 2002–2009 Opel Vectra C saloon and liftback
  - 2002–2009 Vauxhall Vectra saloon and liftback
  - 2002–2009 Holden Vectra
  - 2002–2009 Chevrolet Vectra
  - 2003–2011 Saab 9-3
  - 2004–2007 Chevrolet Malibu
  - 2006–2009 Cadillac BLS
- Extended
  - 2002–2009 Opel Vectra C Caravan
  - 2002–2009 Vauxhall Vectra Caravan
  - 2003–2008 Opel Signum
  - 2004–2007 Chevrolet Malibu Maxx hatchback
  - 2008–2012 Chevrolet Malibu
  - 2005–2010 Pontiac G6
  - 2005–2011 Fiat Croma
  - 2007–2010 Saturn Aura

Cancelled vehicles which would have used this platform:

- 2006 midsized Buick

== Epsilon II ==
A new version of the Epsilon, dubbed Epsilon II, debuted in 2008. It is adaptable for front and all-wheel drive applications. In long wheelbase format, Epsilon II supports US EPA Large Cars, allowing GM to replace the G and W platforms. The architecture was developed by Opel in Rüsselsheim, Germany. Many safety features and AWD fitment modifications were done by Saab.

Current and announced vehicles built on Epsilon II:

- SWB
  - 2008–2017 Opel Insignia, Vauxhall Insignia, Holden Insignia VXR, Buick Regal, Chevrolet Vectra (saloon, hatchback, estate) (SWB)
  - 2012–2016 Chevrolet Malibu, Holden Malibu (SWB)
- SL LWB
  - 2010–2016 Buick LaCrosse/Alpheon (SL LWB)
  - 2010–2012 Saab 9-5 (SL LWB)
  - 2012–2019 Roewe 950 (SL LWB)
- EL LWB
  - 2012–2019 Cadillac XTS (EL LWB)
  - 2014–2019 Chevrolet Impala (EL LWB)

Concept vehicles built on Epsilon II:

- 2007 Buick Riviera
- 2007 Opel GTC Concept

== E2XX ==
E2XX is a moderately updated version of Epsilon 2 platform, consistent with other platform revamps, such as the D2XX based on Delta II.

The E2XX platform targets weight reductions and longer wheelbases.

=== Vehicles ===
Vehicle built on E2XX:

- 2016–2025 Chevrolet Malibu
- 2017–2022 Opel/Vauxhall Insignia, Buick Regal 2018–present (since 2020 China only), Holden Commodore (ZB) 2018–2020
- 2019–present Cadillac XT4
- 2021–present Buick Envision
- 2023–2026 Cadillac GT4

=== P2XX ===
P2XX is the longer variant of the E2XX platform.

Vehicle built on P2XX:

- 2017–2023 Buick LaCrosse

=== C1XX ===
C1XX is the crossover variant of the E2XX platform, replacing the Theta Premium and Lambda platforms.

Vehicles built on C1XX:

Two-row mid-size:

- 2017–present Cadillac XT5
- 2019–present Chevrolet Blazer

Three-row mid-size:

- 2017–2023 GMC Acadia
- 2018–2020 Holden Acadia
- 2019–2025 Buick Enclave (China)
- 2020–present Chevrolet Blazer (China)
- 2020–present Cadillac XT6

Full-size:

- 2018–2024 Buick Enclave
- 2018–2025 Chevrolet Traverse

== See also ==
- List of General Motors platforms
