= Lansing Delta Township Assembly =

Automotive plant in Lansing, Michigan

- Operated: 2006–present
- Location: 8175 Millett Highway; Lansing, Michigan, United States
- Coordinates: 42.6913°N 84.6789°W
- Industry: Automotive
- Products: SUVs
- Employees: 2,978 (2022)
- Area: 320 acres (1.3 km^{2})
- Volume: 3,600,000 sq ft (330,000 m^{2})
- Owner: General Motors
- Website: gm.com/lansing-delta

Lansing Delta Township Assembly (LDT) is an automotive assembly plant in Lansing, Michigan, United States, owned and operated by General Motors. It currently assembles the Buick Enclave, Chevrolet Traverse, and GMC Acadia full-size crossover SUVs for the North American market. Completed in 2006, the factory measures 3,400,000 square feet (320,000 m^{2}) in size, and employed 3,634 hourly workers and 262 salaried workers as of 2010.

The adjacent Lansing Regional Stamping employed 243 hourly workers, and 17 salary workers for a total of 4,156 workers in the factory complex. Its workers are represented by UAW 602 and 652, respectively, and assumed operations of the former Lansing Metal Center and the Lansing Craft Centre when they closed.

== "Green" factory ==
Lansing Delta Township Assembly is a LEED gold-certified automobile plant.

Environmental features of the factory include:

- a 45% reduction in non-manufacturing water use, saving over 4,000,000 US gallons (15,000 m^{3}) of water a year;
- a roof drain system which catches rain water and diverts to cisterns stored above the factory's restrooms, which is then used to flush toilets;
- having 25% of the plant's construction materials composed of recycled materials;
- leaving 50% of the site undeveloped;
- a 20% reduction in energy used for lighting the plant by lowering overall lighting in areas such as aisles; and
- the elimination of ozone-depleting substances used in any of the building's heating and cooling, refrigeration, and fire suppression systems.

The factory grounds also contain a 75-acre (30 ha) wildlife area managed by the factory's Wildlife Habitat Team, who also hosts wildlife educational events for local community groups and schools.

== Vehicles produced ==
=== Current ===
As of September 2022:

- Buick Enclave: 2007–present
- Chevrolet Traverse: 2009–present
- GMC Acadia: 2007–2016, 2024–present

=== Past ===
- Saturn Outlook: 2007–2010
