= GM 9T50 transmission =

9-speed automatic from 2017

9T 45 • 9T 50 • 9T 60 • 9T 65

Overview
- Manufacturer: General Motors
- Production: 2017–present

Body and chassis
- Class: 9-speed transverse automatic transmission
- Related: Ford 8F

Chronology
- Predecessor: 6F 35 • 6F 50 • 6F 55

The General Motors Hydra-Matic 9T 50 and similar 9T 45, 9T 60, and 9T 65 are part of the 9T family of electronic automatic transmissions with nine forward speeds for light-duty transversely-mounted applications. It was designed and manufactured by General Motors, equipped on automobiles starting with the 2017 model year; the 9T family was developed from an earlier joint GM–Ford 6-speed automatic transmission. Ford sells derivatives of the 9T with one forward speed removed as the 8F family.

== History ==
Ford and GM announced a joint venture to share automatic transmission designs in April 2013: GM would adopt a 10-speed longitudinal transmission primarily designed by Ford, and in exchange, Ford would adopt the GM 9T 9-speed transverse transmission. Ford declined to use the GM 9T, however, as the promised improvement in fuel consumption was less than expected, and removed one gear, resulting in the Ford 8F family.

== Design ==
=== Overview ===
During the development of the 9T, GM received 60 new patents while building 800 prototypes. It was developed from the 6T 41 (Gen 3) and designed to occupy approximately the same volume as that prior six-speed automatic and retain that transmission's on-axis design, which aligns all the planetary gears with the crankshaft. The addition of three gears was facilitated by adding a "selectable one-way clutch" which can act either as a sprag clutch, freewheeling in one direction and locking up in the other, or freewheeling in both directions. In addition, the transmission supports start-stop systems by including a spring-loaded hydraulic accumulator to engage the first-gear clutches upon restarting the engine. The 8th gear ratio of the 9T corresponds to the 6th gear ratio of the 6T 40, allowing lower engine speeds in 9th gear. Two of the three planetary gear sets have similar designs between the 9T and 6T 40; for the third, the 9T switches to a compound set.

=== Related: Ford 8F ===
The 9T 50 and similar Ford 8F 35 both share components with the GM 6T 40 and Ford 6F 35.

== Models ==
9T gear ratios
1	2	3	4	5	6	7	8	9	R	Final drive
4.689	3.306	3.012	2.446	1.923	1.446	1.000	0.747	0.617	2.960	2.89, 3.17, 3.32, 3.47, 3.63, 3.80

The last two digits of the model number indicate maximum GVWR and towing capacity, with higher numbers having a larger capacity.

Model differences
Model	Max. trailer weight	Max. GVWR
9T 45	1,743 kg (3,843 lb)	2,700 kg (6,000 lb)
9T 50	2,598 kg (5,728 lb)	2,730 kg (6,020 lb)
9T 60	3,080 kg (6,790 lb)	2,730 kg (6,020 lb)
9T 65	2,473 kg (5,452 lb)	2,930 kg (6,460 lb)

== Applications ==
=== 9T 45 ===
- 2018– GMC Terrain (1.5 L LYX & LSD)

=== 9T 50 ===
- 2019– Cadillac XT4 (2.0 T LSY)* 2020– Cadillac XT6 (2.0 T LSY, 3.6 L LGX)
- 2019– Chevrolet Blazer (2.5 L LCV)
- 2017– Chevrolet Malibu (2.0 T LTG)
- 2020– GMC Acadia (2.5 L LCV)

=== 9T 60 ===
- 2020– GMC Acadia (2.0 T LSY)

=== 9T 65 ===
- 2018– Buick Enclave (3.6 L LFY)
- 2018– Buick LaCrosse (3.6 L LGX)
- 2019– Chevrolet Blazer (3.6 L LGX)
- 2018– Chevrolet Traverse (3.6 L LFY)
- 2018– GMC Acadia (3.6 L LGX)

== Imperfections ==
In December 2020, GM initiated a program to repair or replace 9T 65 transmissions which were causing issues. Repairs were limited to external components only. The program applied to vehicles that had less than 18,000 mi (29,000 km) and had been delivered within the past 18 months. A recall was issued in March 2023 for certain crossover vehicles which may have a transmission that was assembled using an incorrectly sized sun gear.

== See also ==
- List of GM transmissions
