= GM–Ford 6-speed automatic transmission =

Transverse-mounted automatic from 2006

GM 6T • Ford 6F

Overview
- Manufacturer: General Motors (GM); Ford
- Production: 2006–present

Body and chassis
- Class: 6-speed transverse automatic transmission
- Related: GM 6L family Ford 6R family

Chronology
- Predecessor: GM 4T 60-E • 4T 65-E; GM 4T 80-E; Ford AX 4N family
- Successor: GM 9T family Ford 8F family

The GM–Ford 6-speed automatic transmission is an automatic transaxle originally designed for transverse engine applications in cars. With design work having begun in 2002, GM and Ford jointly committed to investing US$ 720 million in their manufacturing plants to support the new transmission. Each company has named and manufactured the transmission separately.

== Manufacturer ==
=== General Motors ===
GM has built the 6T 70, 6T 75, and 6T 80 at Warren Transmission in Warren, Michigan with production starting in July 2006.

=== Ford ===
Ford has built the 6F 50 and 6F 55 along with the 6F 35 at its Van Dyke Transmission Plant in Sterling Heights, Michigan, and later at Sharonville Transmission in Sharonville, Ohio.

== Models ==
=== General Motors ===
The first application of the technology was in the Saturn Aura sedan and the Saturn Outlook crossover. It was also used for the Pontiac G6 GTP models and the GMC Acadia models for 2007.

GM has rated their 6T 70 to 315 hp (235 kW; 319 PS) and 280 lb⋅ft (380 N⋅m), the 6T 75 to 315 hp (235 kW; 319 PS) and 300 lb⋅ft (407 N⋅m), and the 6T 80 to 410 hp (306 kW; 416 PS) and 369 lb⋅ft (500 N⋅m). GM has listed the wet (with fluids) weight of the 6T 70/75/80 to be between 102 and 104.7 kg (225 and 231 lb).

=== Ford ===
The first application of the technology was in the 2007 Ford Edge and Lincoln MKX crossover SUVs.

Ford has rated their 6F 50 to 300 hp (224 kW; 304 PS) and 280 lb⋅ft (380 N⋅m). Ford has apparently not made a public statement regarding the 6F 55's maximum capabilities, but has used it in AWD in the Taurus SHO with an engine rated at 272 kW (365 hp; 370 PS) and 475 N⋅m (350 lb⋅ft) of torque (final drive 2.77:1 standard or 3.16:1 with SHO Performance Package), as well as the tenth-generation Lincoln Continental with an engine rated at 400 hp (298 kW; 406 PS) and 400 lb⋅ft (542 N⋅m).

== Design ==
Gear Ratios
1	2	3	4	5	6	R	Final drive
4.484	2.872	1.842	1.414	1.000	0.742	2.88	2.44, 2.77, 3.16, 3.39

== Imperfections ==
Prior to 2009, this transmission had issues caused by a very weak 3,5,R wave plate, which made this transmission prone to failure in GM products. 2009 updated wave plates were released for many clutches in the 6T70. The old-design wave plates were not stress-relieved and could break with use.

Updates Wave Plates: Part Numbers
Clutch	Part Number
1234	24259063
2–6	24259816
3-5-Rev	24254103
Low-Rev	24259817

== Applications ==
=== General Motors ===
- 2007–2010 Saturn Aura XR (LY7 V6 option)
- 2007 Pontiac G6 GTP
- 2007–2009 Saturn Outlook
- 2007–2017 GMC Acadia
- 2008–2009 Saturn Aura XR
- 2008–2009 Pontiac G6 GXP
- 2008–2017 Buick Enclave
- 2008–2009 Chevrolet Equinox Sport
- 2008–2012 Chevrolet Malibu (LY7 V6 option)
- 2008–2009 Pontiac Torrent GXP
- 2009–2017 Chevrolet Traverse
- 2010–2017 Chevrolet Equinox (LF1, LFW, LFX V6 option)
- 2010–2016 Cadillac SRX
- 2010–2016 Buick LaCrosse (LF1, LLT, LFX V6 options)
- 2012–2020 Chevrolet Impala
- 2013–2019 Cadillac XTS
- 2010–2017 GMC Terrain (LF1, LFW, LFX V6 option)
- 2008–2010 Saturn Vue XE AWD 3.5 V6 LZ4 XR FWD/AWD 3.6 V6 LY7 (Note: Only vehicle to have used the GM METRIC bellhousing for 6T 70. LS4/60 degree V6 etc.)
- 2013–2022 Buick Encore
- 2015–2026 Chevrolet Trax
- 2024–2026 Buick Envista

=== Ford ===
- 2007–2018 Ford Edge
- 2007–2018 Lincoln MKX
- 2008–2019 Ford Taurus
- 2008–2009 Ford Taurus X
- 2008–2009 Mercury Sable
- 2009–2019 Ford Flex
- 2009–2016 Lincoln MKS
- 2009–2012 Ford Escape
- 2009–2011 Mercury Mariner
- 2009–2011 Mazda Tribute
- 2010–2020 Ford Fusion
- 2013–2020 Lincoln MKZ
- 2010–2011 Mercury Milan
- 2010–2019 Ford Taurus
- 2013–2019 Ford Police Interceptor Sedan
- 2011–2019 Ford Explorer
- 2013–2019 Ford Police Interceptor Utility
- 2012–2022 Ford Mondeo
- 2015–2018 Ford C-Max with 1.5L EcoBoost
- 2016–2019 Ford Focus with 1.5L EcoBoost 182
- 2017–2020 Lincoln Continental

== See also ==
- List of Ford transmissions
- List of GM transmissions

== Sources ==
- "New fuel-saving 6-speed transaxle to propel Ford Edge to head of crossover utility class". Ford Motor Company press release. Archived from the original on October 5, 2012.
- "New Hydra-Matic 6T 70 Six-Speed Automatic Delivers Performance and Fuel Economy". TheAutoChannel.
- "Technologically Advanced Transmissions Enter GM Fleet". AutoTrends. Archived from the original on June 25, 2008.
- Lewis, Charles; Bollwahn, Bryce (2007-04-16). "General Motors Hydra-Matic & amp; Ford New FWD Six-Speed Automatic Transmission Family". SAE Technical Paper. doi:10.4271/2007-01-1095.
