= Holden Captiva =

Crossover SUV from Holden

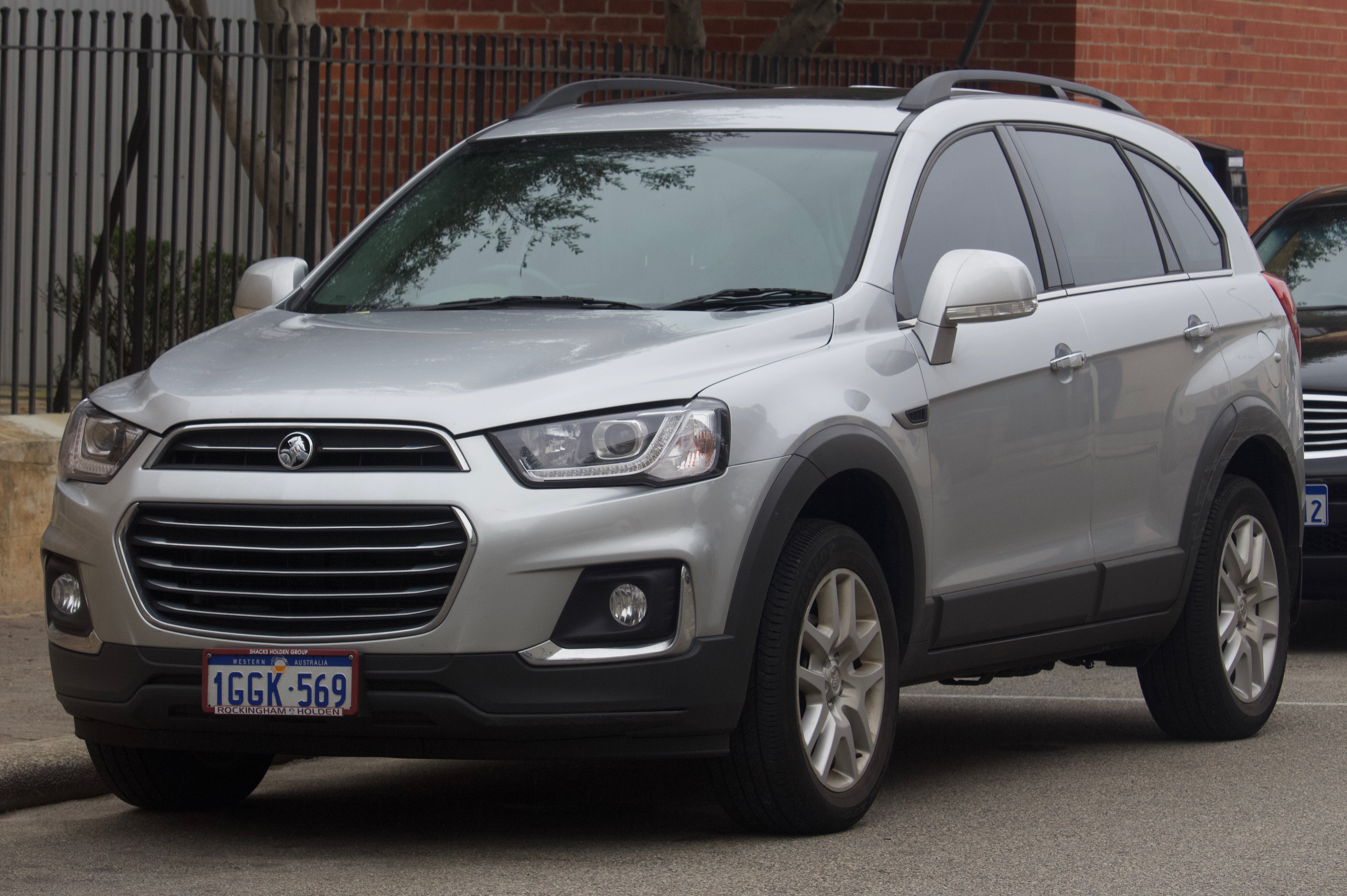

Overview
- Manufacturer: General Motors
- Production: 2006–2018

Chronology
- Predecessor: Holden Adventra; Holden Frontera
- Successor: Holden Equinox (five seat); Holden Acadia (seven seat)

The Holden Captiva is a crossover SUV that was produced from 2006 to 2018 by GM Korea (previously known as Daewoo). The car was sold in Australia and New Zealand under the Holden brand and derives from either the Chevrolet Captiva or Opel Antara, depending on the variant and year.

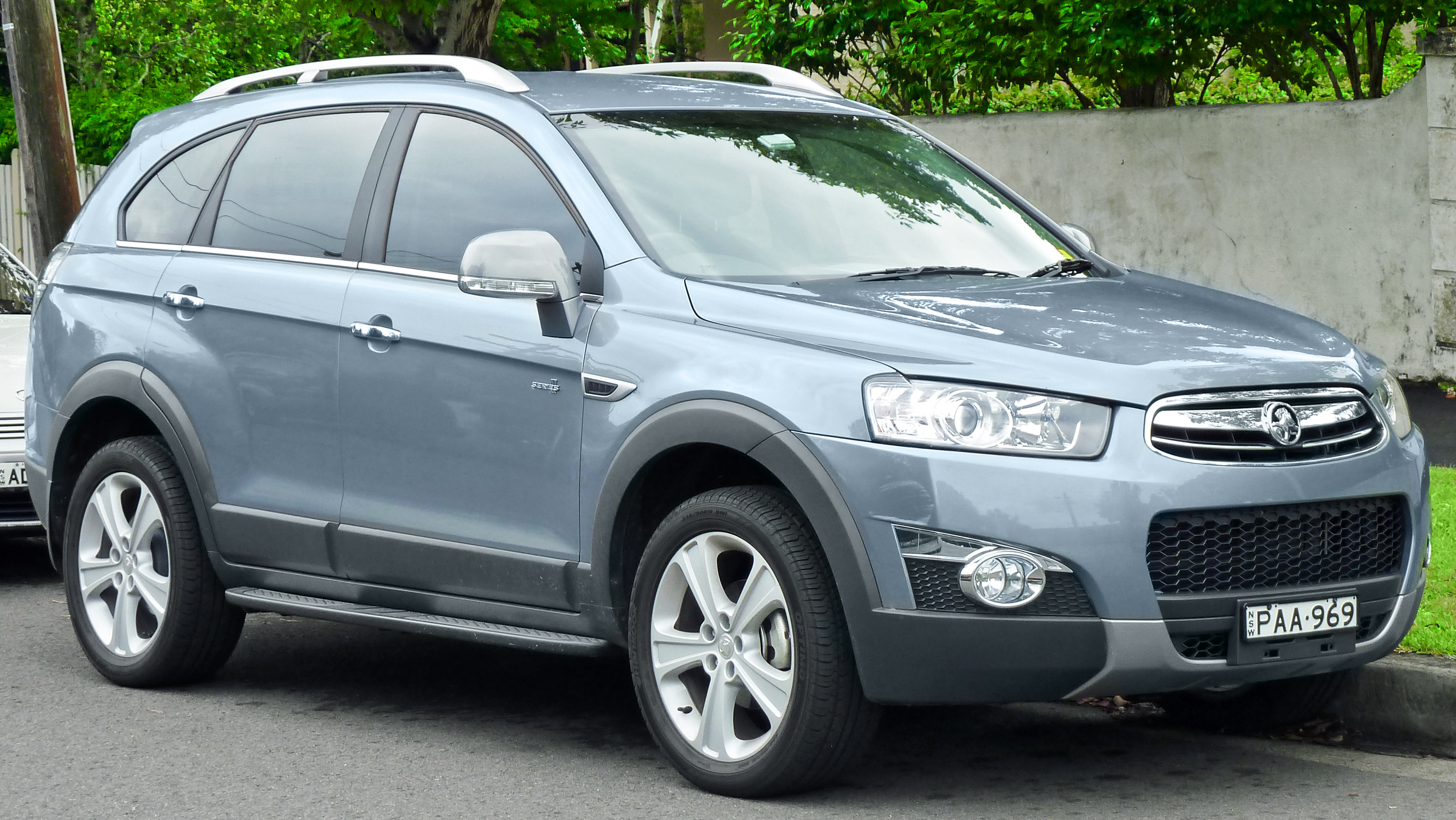
Holden Captiva (2006–2009; 2016–2018)
Holden Captiva 7 (2009–2016)

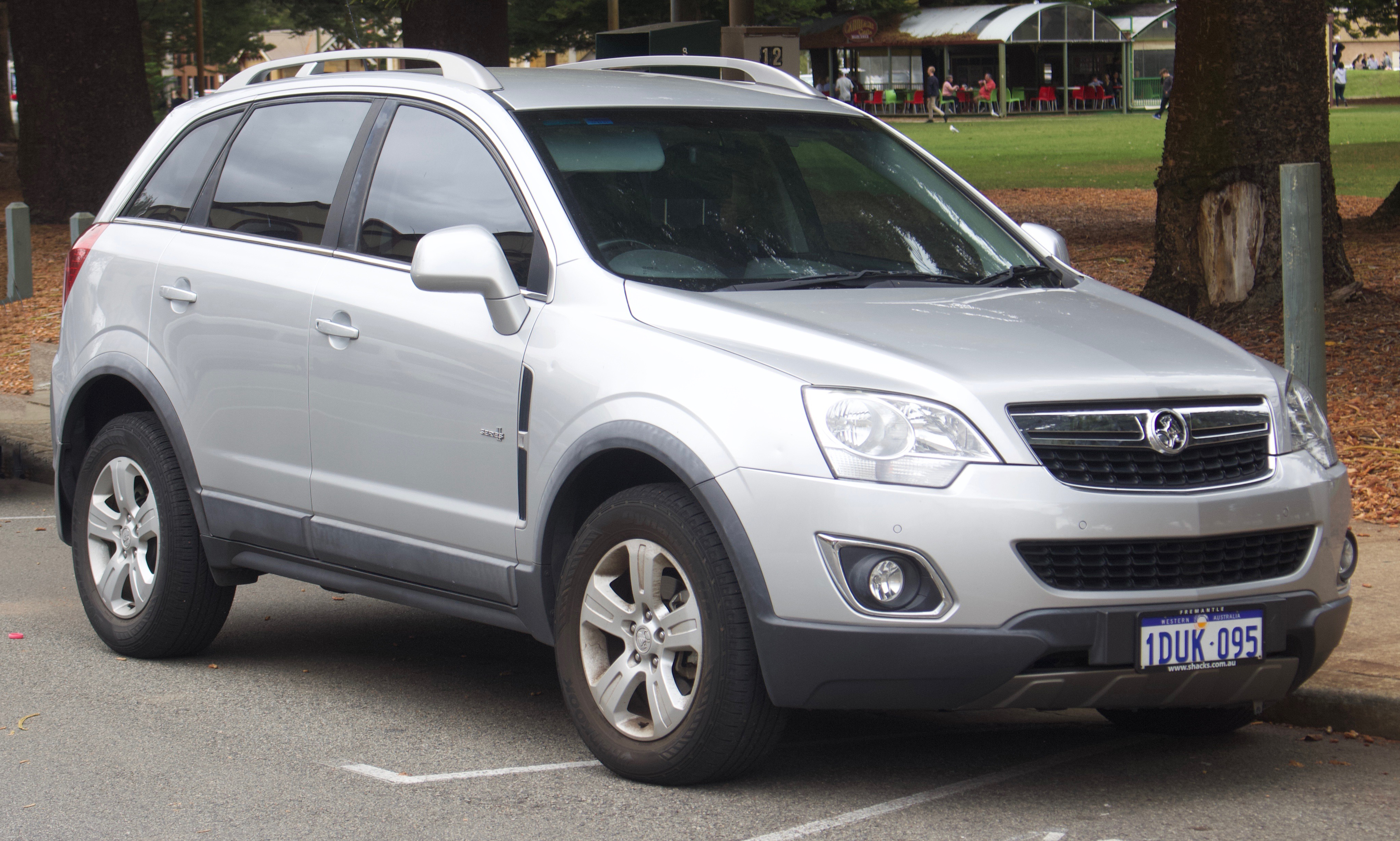
Holden Captiva MaXX (2006–2008)
Holden Captiva 5 (2009–2016)

The Holden Captiva range comprised two similar vehicles, the Captiva (known elsewhere as the Chevrolet Captiva) and the range topping Captiva MaXX (based on the Opel Antara). Sales commenced in October 2006. Holden discontinued the Captiva MaXX in 2008, only to revive it in 2009 as the entry level Captiva 5, with the new suffix denoting its five seat layout.

From this point onwards, the regular Captiva became seven seat only offering and adopted the name Captiva 7.

In the beginning of 2016, Holden discontinued the Captiva 5 variant. At this time the facelift of the Captiva 7 launched, with Holden dropping the numerical suffix (thus reverting to the Captiva name) and resuming availability of the five person seating layout (with seven seats optional). For the final update for 2018, Holden again discontinued the five seat variant due to the launch of the Holden Equinox.

Due to its poor reliability, the Captiva is commonly nicknamed the 'Craptiva'.

== Successor ==
Holden announced in July 2017 that by the end of 2018, the Captiva would be discontinued in Australia and New Zealand, being replaced by two new models, these being the Equinox and Acadia. The Equinox officially arrived in November 2017, replacing the five seat variant. Meanwhile, the Acadia went on sale in Australia on 12 November 2018, taking the place of the seven seat Captiva and bringing an end to the nameplate Captiva in both Australia and New Zealand.

General Motors officially ended global production on the first generation Captiva in September 2018, as it was being replaced with by the Equinox and Acadia for Oceania.

== Safety ==
ANCAP test results* Holden Captiva 5 door wagon (2007)
Test	Score
Overall	4 /5 stars
Frontal offset	12.23/16
Side impact	16/16
Pole	1/2
Seat belt reminders	2/3
Whiplash protection	Not Assessed
Pedestrian protection	Marginal
Electronic stability control	Standard

ANCAP test results* Holden Captiva all front-wheel-drive variants (2011)
Test	Score
Overall	5 /5 stars
Frontal offset	14.32/16
Side impact	16/16
Pole	1/2
Seat belt reminders	2/3
Whiplash protection	Not Assessed
Pedestrian protection	Marginal
Electronic stability control	Standard

ANCAP test results* Holden Captiva 5 all front-wheel-drive variants (2011)
Test	Score
Overall	5 /5 stars
Frontal offset	14.32/16
Side impact	16/16
Pole	1/2
Seat belt reminders	2/3
Whiplash protection	Not Assessed
Pedestrian protection	Marginal
Electronic stability control	Standard

ANCAP test results* Holden Captiva 7 all front-wheel-drive variants (2011)
Test	Score
Overall	5 /5 stars
Frontal offset	14.32/16
Side impact	16/16
Pole	1/2
Seat belt reminders	2/3
Whiplash protection	Not Assessed
Pedestrian protection	Marginal
Electronic stability control	Standard
