= Cadillac XTS =

Full-size luxury sedan from Cadillac

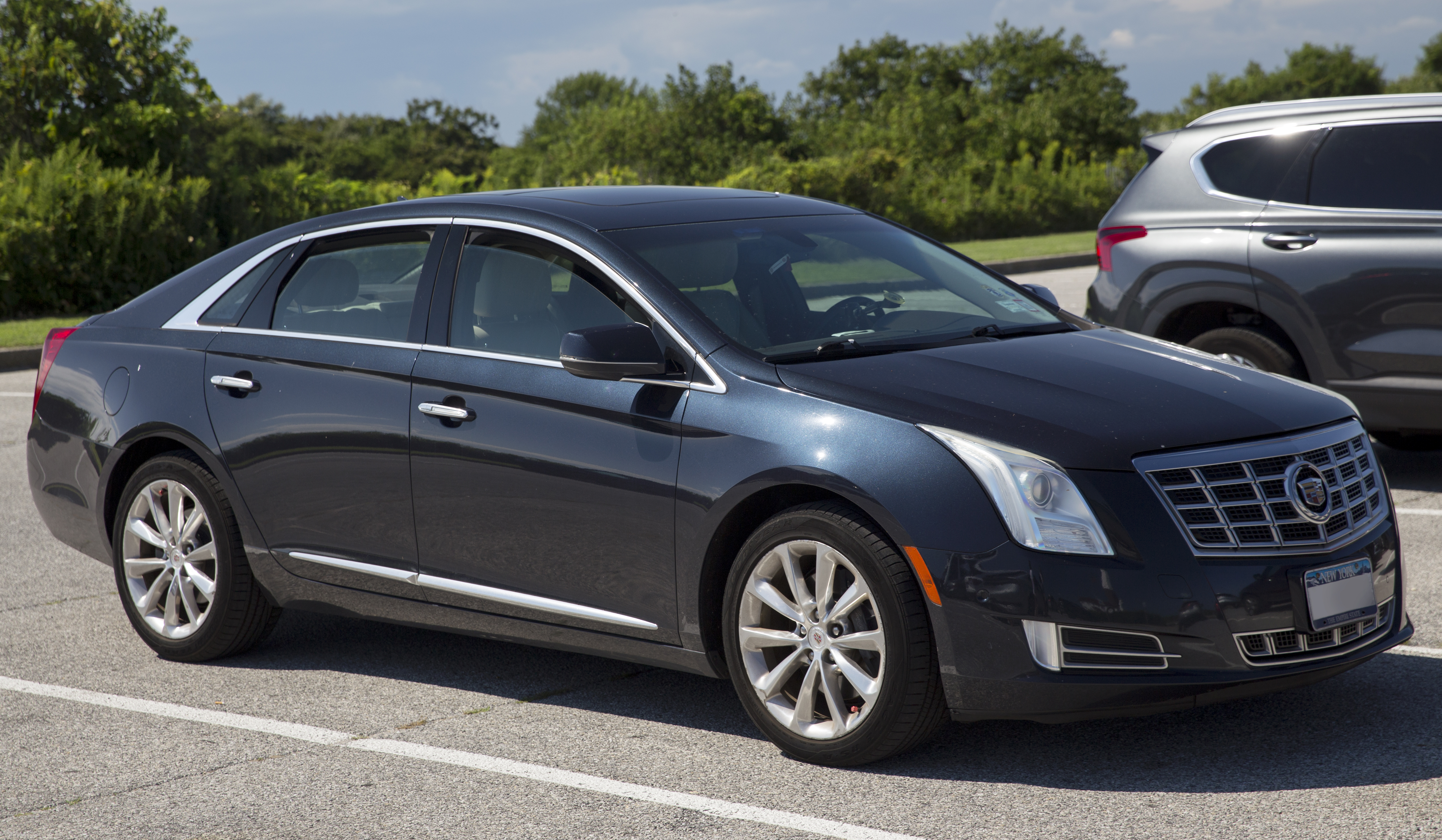
- 2014 Cadillac XTS Luxury

Overview
- Manufacturer: Cadillac (General Motors)
- Production: Canada and US: May 2012–October 2019; China: February 2013–2020
- Model years: 2013–2019; 2014–2020 (China)
- Assembly: Canada: Oshawa, Ontario (Oshawa Car Assembly); China: Shanghai (Shanghai GM)
- Designer: Tim Kozub; Christine Park (interior)

Body and chassis
- Class: Full-size car
- Body style: 4-door sedan
- Layout: Front-engine, front-wheel drive / all-wheel drive
- Platform: GM Epsilon II LWB
- Related: Chevrolet Impala; Buick LaCrosse; Saab 9-5

Powertrain
- Engine: Gasoline: 2.0 L LTG turbo I4; 3.6 L LFX V6; 3.6 L LF3 turbo V6
- Transmission: 6-speed 6T70 automatic; 6-speed 6T75 automatic

Dimensions
- Wheelbase: 111.7 in (2,837 mm); 118.7 in (3,015 mm) (XTS-L)
- Length: 201.9 in (5,128 mm) (2013–2017); 200.9 in (5,103 mm) (2018–2019); 205.2 in (5,212 mm) (XTS-L)
- Width: 72.9 in (1,852 mm)
- Height: 59.1 in (1,501 mm) (2013–2017); 59.4 in (1,509 mm) (2018–2019)
- Curb weight: FWD: 3,995 lb (1,812 kg); AWD: 4,180 lb (1,896 kg)

Chronology
- Predecessor: Cadillac DTS; Cadillac STS/SLS
- Successor: Cadillac CT5

The Cadillac XTS (short for X-Series Touring Sedan) is a full-size car built by the American company Cadillac from 2013 until 2019. It is a four-door sedan with seating for up to five passengers. Based on an enlarged version of General Motors' Epsilon II platform, it has a front-mounted engine that either drives the front wheels or drives all four wheels.

Replacing the smaller Cadillac STS and larger DTS, production began in May 2012 at the Oshawa Assembly Plant and launched in June as a 2013 model. Marketed with left-hand drive in the United States, Canada, Mexico, China, and the Middle East (except Israel), the XTS was also assembled by Shanghai GM, with production beginning in February 2013.

== Interior ==
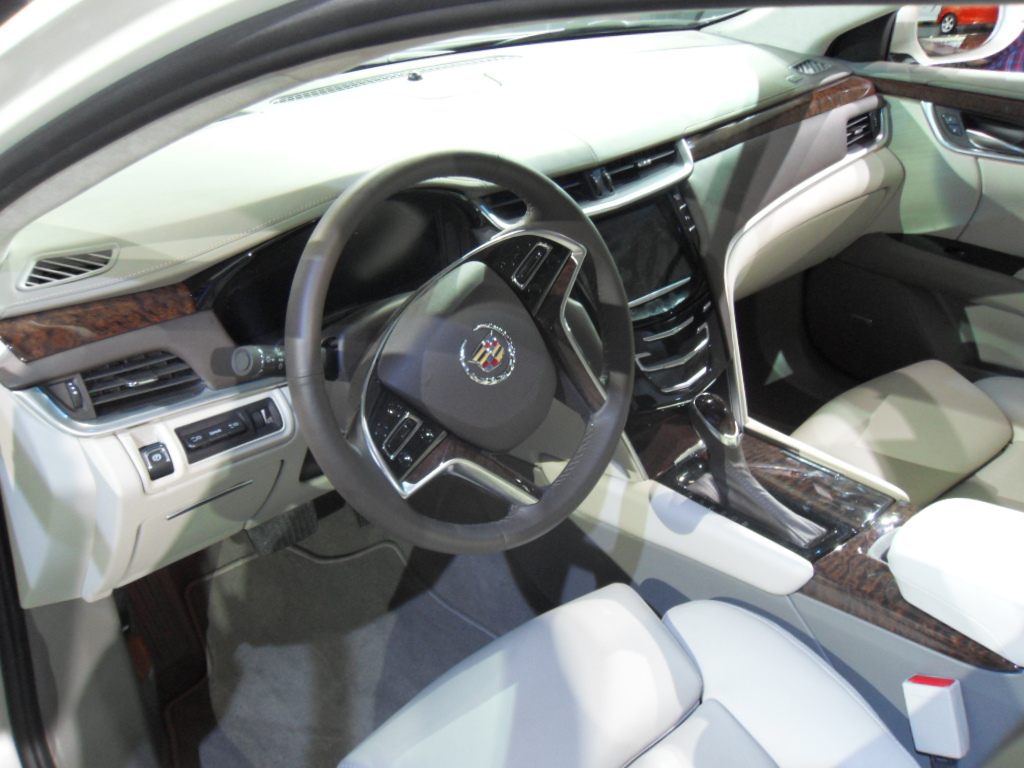
Interior

In addition to the base XTS, there are five trim packages labeled "Luxury", "Premium Luxury", and "Platinum", with the optional XTS V-Sport offered in both "V-Sport Premium Luxury" and "V-Sport Platinum". Some of the standard features include dual-zone automatic climate control, 4G LTE connectivity, adaptive cruise control, keyless entry, leather seat-upholstery, 8-way power front seats, parking assist and comprehensive safety equipment like ABS, stability control, dual-stage front airbags, front side airbags, side-curtain airbags front and rear, and a driver side knee airbag.

Optional equipment includes separate climate controls for rear seat passengers, coupled with eight-inch LCD screens that flip up from the front passenger seat-backs, allowing an internal DVD player to display content with wireless headphones. The interior can be outfitted in a large assortment of color combinations, along with four wood selections. Cadillac's CUE system is standard with an 8-speaker Bose sound system, including HD Radio and SiriusXM. An optional 14-speaker Bose sound package includes AudioPilot noise compensation technology.

== Powertrain ==
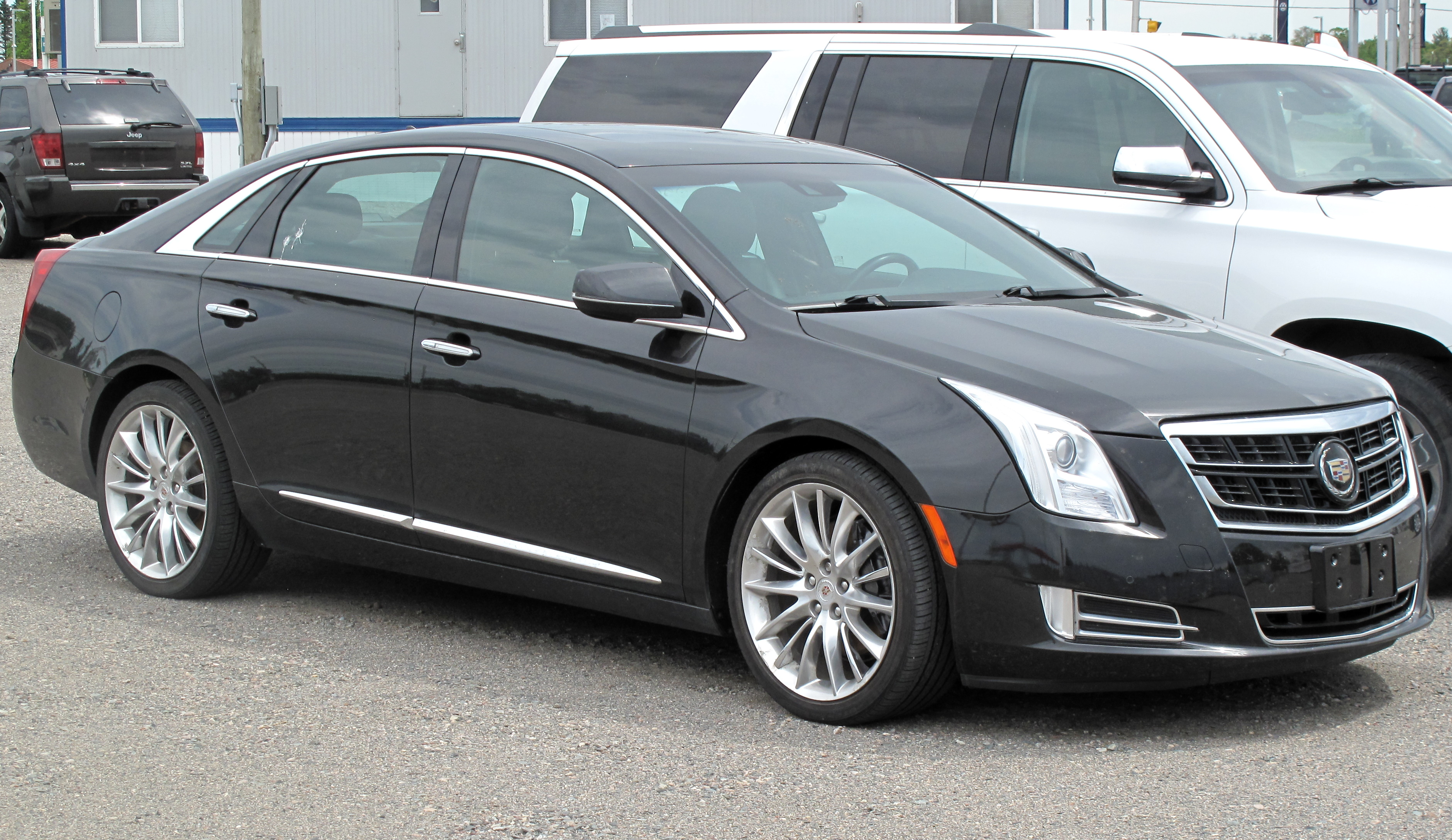
2014 Cadillac XTS V-Sport Platinum

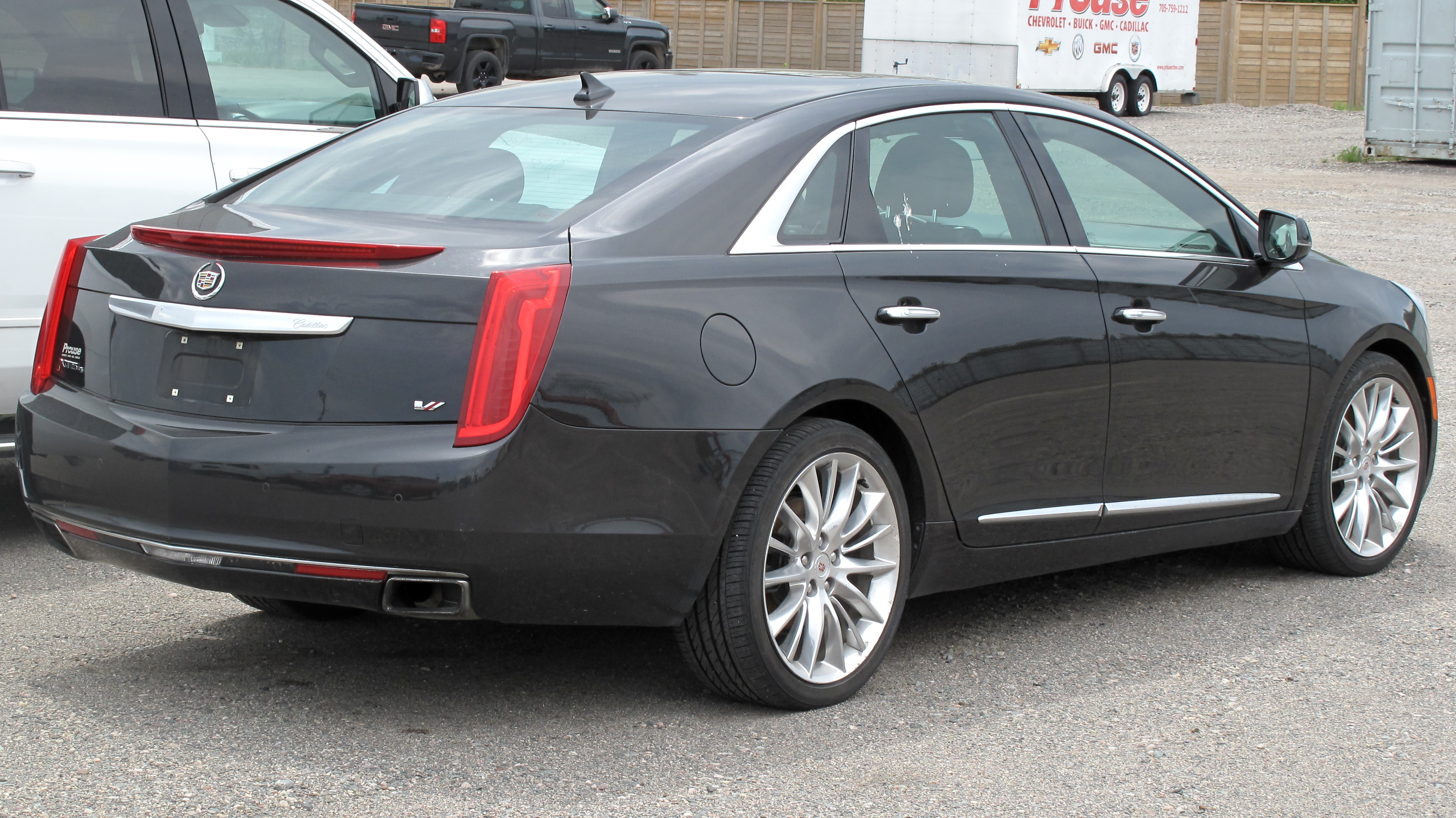
Rear view (V-Sport Platinum)

The XTS is available with two engines: a four-cylinder 2.0-liter turbo for China only, and a 3.6-liter with 304 hp (227 kW) and 264 lb⋅ft (358 N⋅m), with available twin-turbocharging on the XTS V-Sport providing 410 hp (306 kW) and 369 lb⋅ft (500 N⋅m) together with cylinder deactivation. The XTS is available in both front-wheel drive and optional all-wheel drive (standard on V-Sport vehicles) which includes a limited-slip differential and torque vectoring.

XTS Powertrains
Displacement	Fuel	GM Type	Configuration	Aspiration	Power	Torque	Transmission	Note	Years
2.0 L (1,998 cc)	Gasoline	LTG	I4	Turbocharged	272 hp (203 kW) at 5,500 rpm	260 lb⋅ft (353 N⋅m) at 1,700-5,500 rpm	6-speed automatic	China	2013-2019
3.6 L (3,564 cc)	Gasoline	LFX	V6	Natural	304 hp (227 kW) at 6,800 rpm	264 lb⋅ft (358 N⋅m) at 5,300 rpm	6-speed automatic		2013-2019
3.6 L (3,564 cc)	Gasoline	LF3	V6	Turbocharged	410 hp (306 kW) at 6,000 rpm	369 lb⋅ft (500 N⋅m) at 1,900 rpm	6-speed automatic	VSport	2013-2019

== Facelift ==
For 2018, the XTS received a mid-cycle refresh including new front and rear styling.

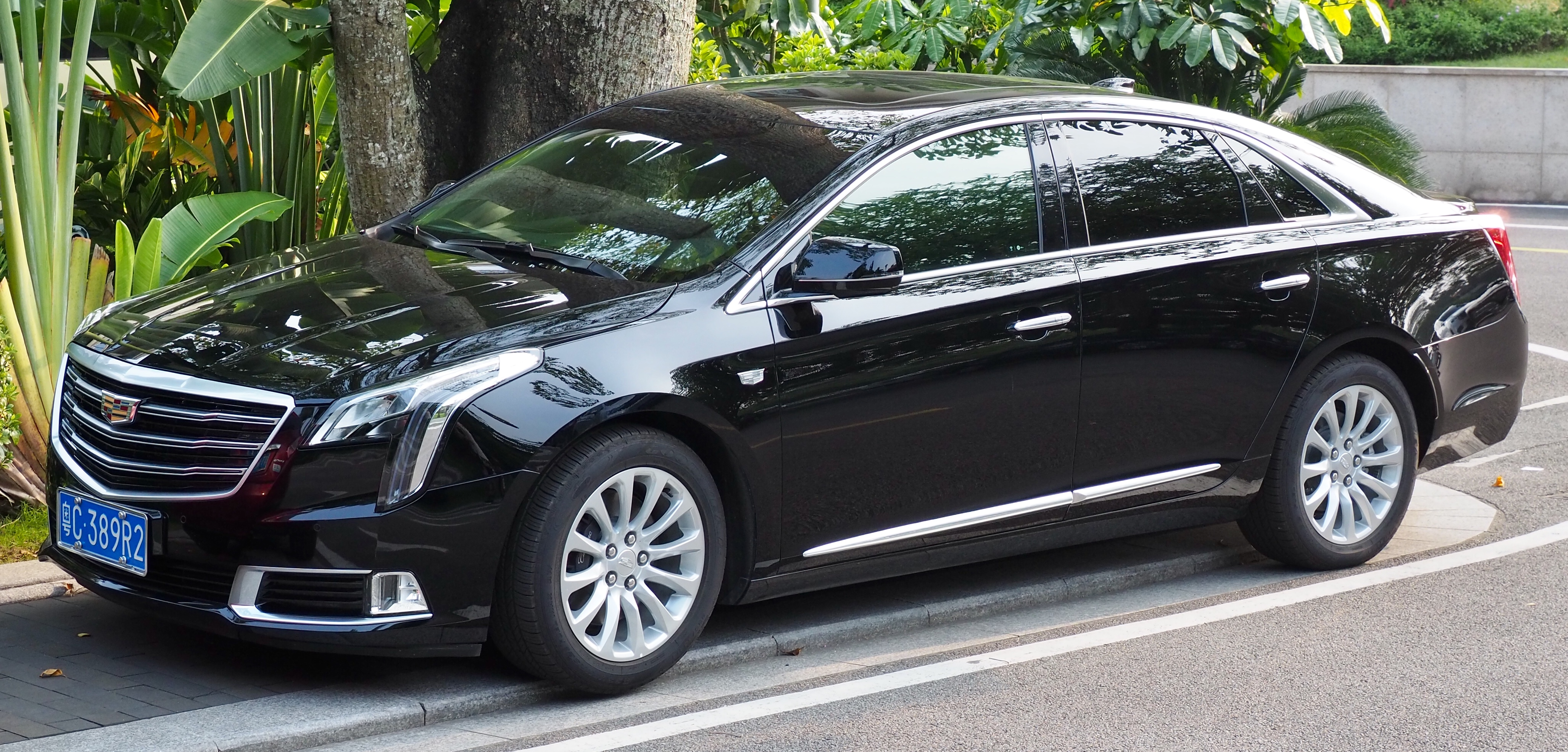
2018 Cadillac XTS (front)

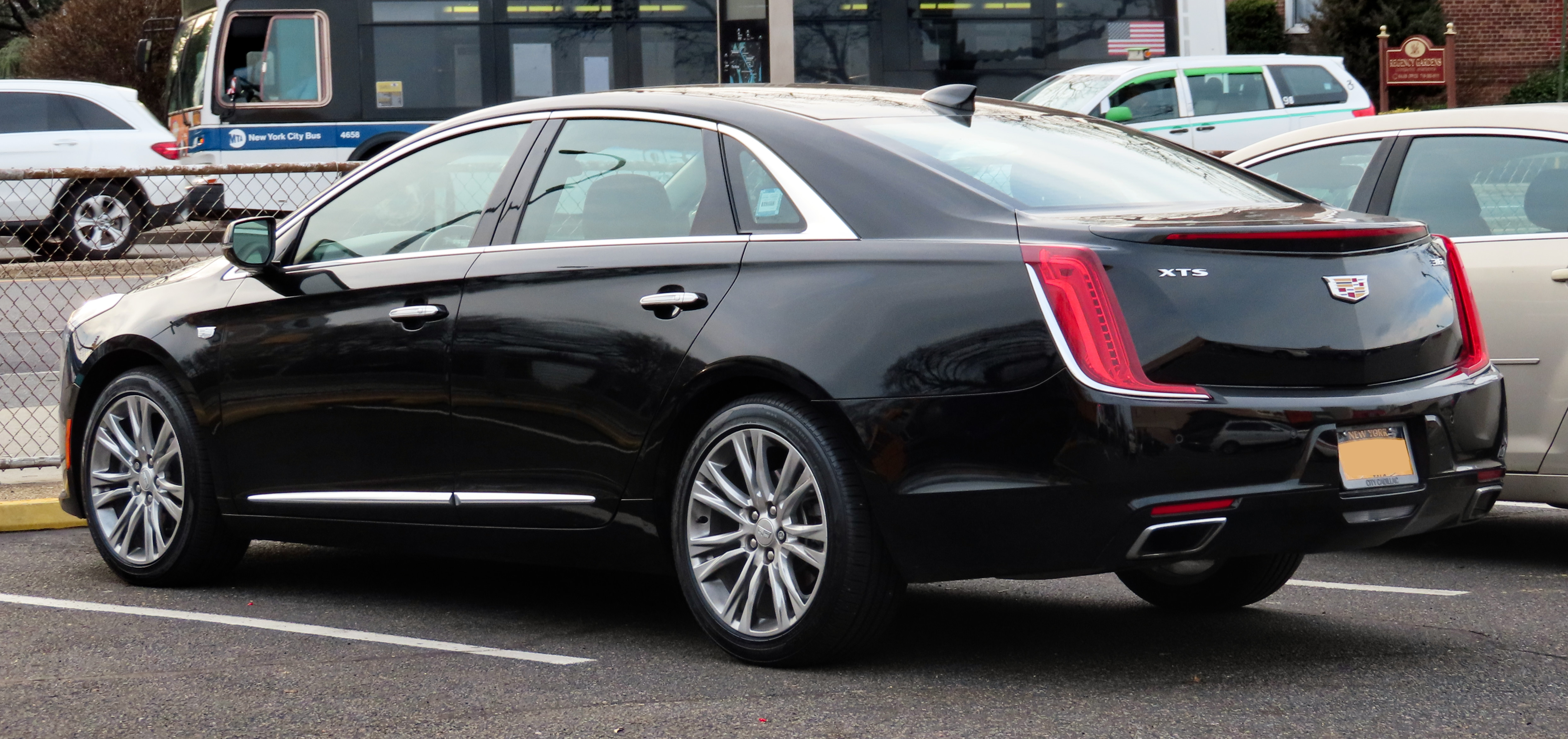
2019 Cadillac XTS (rear)

== Other versions ==
A long-wheelbase version XTS, called the XTS-L, as well as limousine and hearse versions, were available for fleet and coachbuilder markets. They are no longer manufactured as of late 2019.

== XTS Platinum concept ==
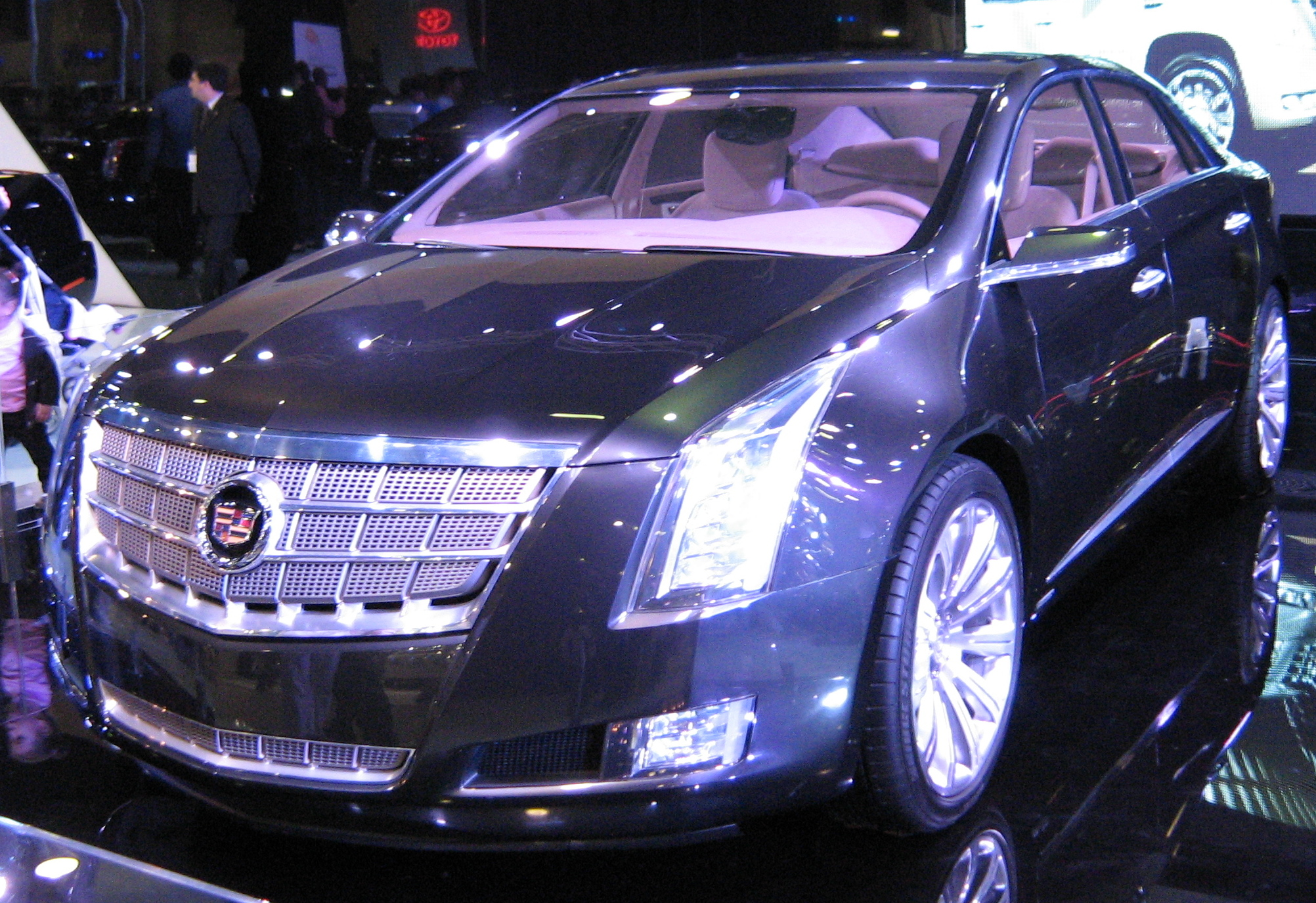
Cadillac XTS Platinum concept

General Motors exhibited a concept sedan called the XTS Platinum at the 2010 North American International Auto Show after privately unveiling the vehicle to automotive journalists on August 11, 2009. The concept was all-wheel drive and was powered by a 3.6 L (220 cu in) V6 plug-in hybrid system estimated at 350 hp (260 kW). Its interior was based on hand-cut-and-sewn materials and uses OLED displays in place of traditional gauges and screens. A Platinum version of the production XTS went on sale in 2013.

== Sales ==
Calendar Year	United States	China	Global
2012	15,049		
2013	32,559	14,683	
2014	24,335	32,390	
2015	23,112	22,285	48,851
2016	22,171	33,291	
2017	16,275	41,645	
2018	17,727	65,010	
2019	11,304	42,234	
2020	1,199		

== See also ==
- Cadillac CT6
