= Ford 8F transmission =

8-speed automatic from 2019

8F 24 • 8F 35 • 8F 40 • 8F 57 8F SelectShift

Overview
- Manufacturer: Ford
- Production: 2019–present

Body and chassis
- Class: 8-speed transverse automatic transmission
- Related: GM 9T50

Chronology
- Predecessor: 6F35/6F50/6F55

The Ford 8F transmission is a family of automatic transmissions with eight forward speeds for light-duty transversely-mounted applications. It is designed and manufactured by Ford Motor Company starting in 2019; the 8F35 is derived from the General Motors 9TXX family, which in turn was developed from an earlier GM 6T40 transmission.

== History ==
Ford and GM announced a joint venture to share automatic transmission designs in April 2013: GM would adopt a 10-speed longitudinal transmission primarily designed by Ford, while Ford would adopt the GM 9T 9-speed transverse transmission.

== Design ==
Ford declined to use the GM 9T, however, as the promised improvement in fuel consumption was less than expected, and removed one gear, resulting in the Ford 8F35. At the same time, Ford also launched the 8F24 and 8F57 transmissions. The 8F24 is unique to Ford, while the 8F57 is derived from an earlier GM-Ford 6-speed automatic transmission.

== Models ==
8FXX gear ratios
1	2	3	4	5	6	7	8	R
4.689	3.306	3.012	1.923	1.446	1.000	0.747	0.617	2.960

=== 8F24 ===
The 8F24 is designed for engines with a maximum output of 240 N⋅m (180 lbf⋅ft).

Applications

- Ford Escape (1.5 EcoBoost)
- Ford Focus (1.0 EcoBoost)

=== 8F35 ===
The 8F35 is derived from the GM 9T50 and both share components with the GM 6T40 and Ford 6F35. The change in ratio between the 2nd and 3rd gears is relatively small; in later versions, the transmission is instructed to skip 2nd gear entirely to enhance throttle response. It uses six solenoids (on two driving clutches and four brake clutches), and a selectable one-way clutch, applied in different combinations to engage the eight forward speeds and reverse. It is designed for engines with a maximum output of 350 N⋅m (260 lbf⋅ft).

Applications

- Ford Edge (2.0 Duratorq, 2.0 EcoBoost)
- Ford Escape (1.5 EcoBoost, 2.0 EcoBoost)
- Ford Focus (1.5 EcoBoost, 1.5 EcoBlue)
- Ford Maverick (2.0 EcoBoost)
- Ford S-MAX (1.5 EcoBoost, 2.0 Duratorq, 2.0 EcoBoost)
- Ford Taurus (2.0 EcoBoost)
- Lincoln Corsair, presumably 2.0

=== 8F40 ===
Applications

- Ford Edge (2.0 EcoBlue)
- Ford Focus (2.0 EcoBlue)
- Ford Galaxy (2.0 EcoBlue)
- Ford Kuga (2.0 EcoBlue)
- Ford Mondeo (2.0 EcoBlue)
- Ford S-MAX (2.0 EcoBlue)
- Lincoln Corsair, presumably 2.3

=== 8F57 ===
The 8F57 is designed for engines with a maximum output of 575 N⋅m (424 lbf⋅ft).

Applications

- Ford Edge ST (2.7 V6 EcoBoost)
- Ford Explorer (2.7 V6 EcoBoost)
- Ford Fusion (2.7 V6 EcoBoost)
- Ford Taurus (2.7 V6 EcoBoost)

=== 8F SelectShift (Unknown model number) ===
Applications

- Lincoln Z

== See also ==
- List of Ford transmissions
