= GMC Acadia =

Full-size crossover SUV

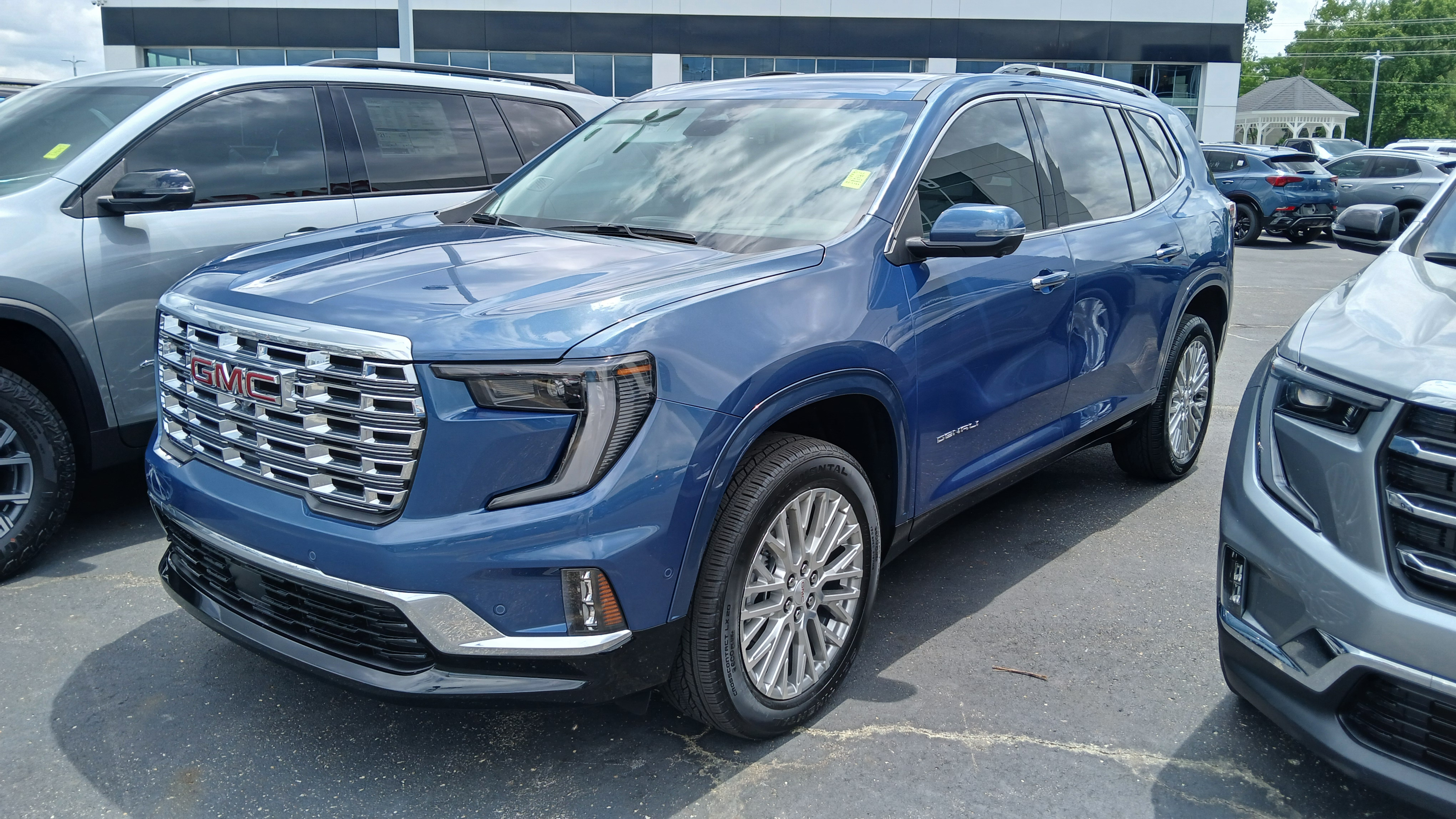
- 2024 GMC Acadia Denali in Downpour (Blue) Metallic

Overview
- Manufacturer: General Motors
- Also called: Holden Acadia (2018–2020)
- Production: 2006–present
- Model years: 2007–present

Body and chassis
- Class: Full-size crossover SUV (2007–2017, 2024–present); Mid-size crossover SUV (2017–2023)
- Body style: 5-door SUV
- Layout: Front-engine, front-wheel-drive; Front-engine, all-wheel-drive

Chronology
- Predecessor: GMC Envoy XL; GMC Safari; Isuzu Ascender (7-passenger version); Pontiac Montana SV6; Saturn Outlook

The GMC Acadia is a crossover SUV manufactured by General Motors for its GMC division. The first-generation GMC Acadia shared the GM Lambda platform with the Saturn Outlook, the Chevrolet Traverse, and the Buick Enclave. The Acadia went on sale in 2006 as a 2007 model in the United States, Canada and Mexico. The Acadia replaces three of the 7- or 8-seater vehicles on the Buick-Pontiac–GMC dealership network, the midsize GMC Safari van, the GMC Envoy, and the Pontiac Montana SV6 minivan for the domestic market. As of 2009, the Lambda vehicles had replaced the Buick Rainier, Buick Rendezvous, Buick Terraza, and the GMC Envoy XL and then subsequently the GMC Envoy, Chevrolet TrailBlazer and the Isuzu Ascender. A Denali version of the Acadia debuted for 2011. In 2017, the second generation Acadia was repositioned as a mid-size crossover utility vehicle in order to compete in the growing midsize SUV market against the likes of the Ford Explorer, Edge, and the Jeep Grand Cherokee.

== First generation (2007) ==
First generation
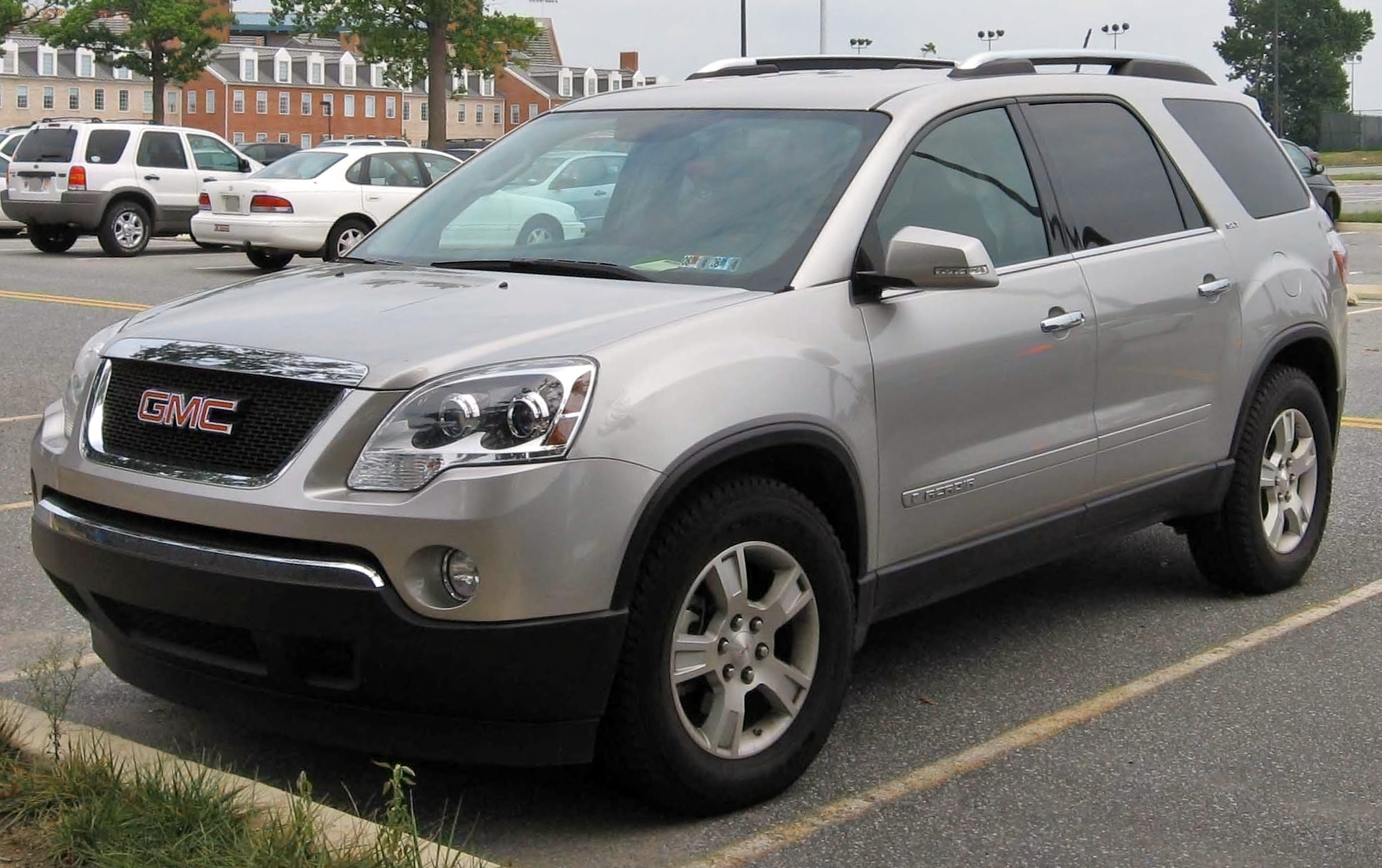
- Pre-facelift GMC Acadia

Overview
- Production: 2006–2017
- Model years: 2007–2016; 2017 (Acadia Limited)
- Assembly: United States: Lansing, Michigan (Lansing Delta Township Assembly)
- Designer: Bryan Nesbitt

Body and chassis
- Platform: GM Lambda platform/GMT968 (Series GMT960)
- Related: Buick Enclave; Chevrolet Traverse; Saturn Outlook

Powertrain
- Engine: 3.6 L LY7 V6; 3.6 L LLT V6
- Transmission: 6-speed 6T75 automatic

Dimensions
- Wheelbase: 118.9 in (3,020 mm)
- Length: 2007–2008 & 2013–2016: 201.1 in (5,108 mm); 2009–2012: 200.7 in (5,098 mm)
- Width: 2007–2008 & 2013–2016: 78.9 in (2,004 mm); 2009–2012: 78.2 in (1,986 mm)
- Height: 2007–2008 & 2013–2016: 72.8 in (1,849 mm); 2009–2012: 69.9 in (1,775 mm)

The Acadia represents GMC's entry-level truck-like CUV and is the first unibody vehicle from the marque. It is also GMC's first front-wheel drive passenger vehicle, and also the first such vehicle of any kind since the 1973-78 GMC Motorhome. The Acadia was originally intended to be a Pontiac, and was changed to a GMC after styling had been essentially completed. The console shifter design in particular has cues inspired from 60's and 70's Pontiacs. The Acadia exterior has a smoother design than was typical for GMCs of the same era. The squared-off wheelwell openings of the Saturn Outlook would have made more sense on a GMC - and in fact were put onto the Acadia when the design was freshened for 2013 (and the Saturn brand eliminated).

The Acadia has seating for eight and either front or all-wheel drive. With a 5,200 lb (2,359 kg) towing capacity, the Acadia slots between the GMC Terrain and the Yukon. The Acadia is the mid-priced Lambda model between the Chevrolet Traverse and Enclave.

In December 2006, all production and sales of the Acadia (and the Saturn Outlook) were temporarily stopped due to the engine mounts not having holes drilled to release accumulated water, as well as an issue with potentially faulty rivets in the load floor just forward of the vehicle's rear hatch. The assembly process was quickly adjusted, and dealership sales of the vehicles had resumed within days of the notice.

The first-generation Acadia was sold alongside its second-generation replacement as the Acadia Limited.

=== Suspension and chassis ===
The 2008 Acadia has a 118.9 in (3,020 mm) wheelbase and 67.28 in (1,709 mm) front/rear tracks. The independent front suspension is a MacPherson strut design, with a direct-acting stabilizer bar and aluminum knuckles. The independent rear suspension uses a "H" Linked design.

Steering is power-assisted rack-and-pinion, with an optional variable-effort system. Four-wheel disc brakes with ABS are standard. 19 inch cast aluminum wheels and Goodyear Eagle RS-A M+S P255/60R-19 108H tires with a high-pressure compact spare tire are standard on the SLT2 model and optional on the SLT1. The SLE model has 18 inch painted aluminum wheels with P255/65R-18 tires. The SLT1 comes standard with 18 inch machined aluminum wheels.

=== Engine and transmission ===
The Acadia uses GM's High Feature LY7 V6 that was introduced in the Cadillac CTS. In the Acadia, the engine produces 275 hp (205 kW) and 258 lb⋅ft (350 N⋅m) of torque. The Acadia also uses the new GM-Ford 6-speed automatic transmission.

The 2009 model year engine was the direct injected LLT, producing 288 hp (215 kW) and 270 lb⋅ft (366 N⋅m) of torque.

The 2012 Acadia has a 3.6 L V6 engine producing 288 hp (215 kW) at 6,300 rpm and 270 lb⋅ft (366 N⋅m) of torque at 3,400 rpm.

The 2016 Acadia Limited has a 3.6 L V6 engine producing 310 hp (231 kW) and 271 lb ft (367 Nm) of torque.

Year	Engine	Power	Torque	Transmission
2007–2008	3.6 L LY7 V6	275 hp (205 kW)	251 lb⋅ft (340 N⋅m)	6-speed 6T75
2009–2016	3.6 L LLT V6	288 hp (215 kW)	270 lb⋅ft (366 N⋅m)	6-speed 6T75
2016	3.6 L LGX V6	310 hp (231 kW)	271 lb·ft (367 N·m)	6-speed 6T70

=== Interior ===
The Acadia features available 3-row, 7 or 8-seater seating, although the post-2017 models downsized the 3rd-row seating capacity from 3 to 2 passengers. Inside, the Acadia features more contemporary trim than the Outlook, including chrome and satin nickel textures, and a wider variety of two-toned interior colors such as an Ebony and Light Titanium (grey) cloth upholstery, and a choice of either Ebony, Light Titanium (grey) or Brick (brown) leather upholstery. A heads-up display is one of the available options exclusive to the Acadia and standard on the Acadia Denali.

=== Acadia Denali ===
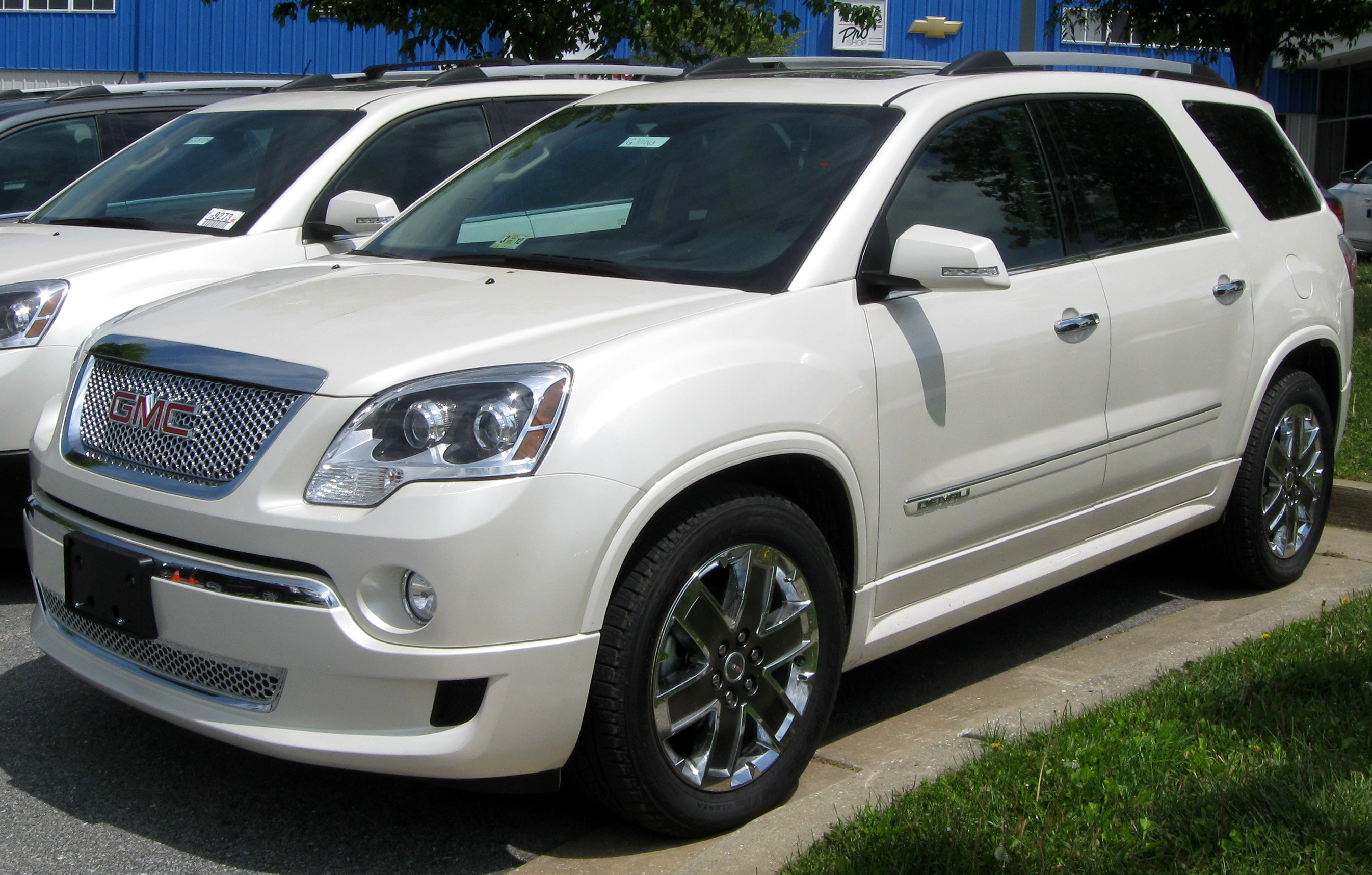
First generation GMC Acadia Denali (2011)

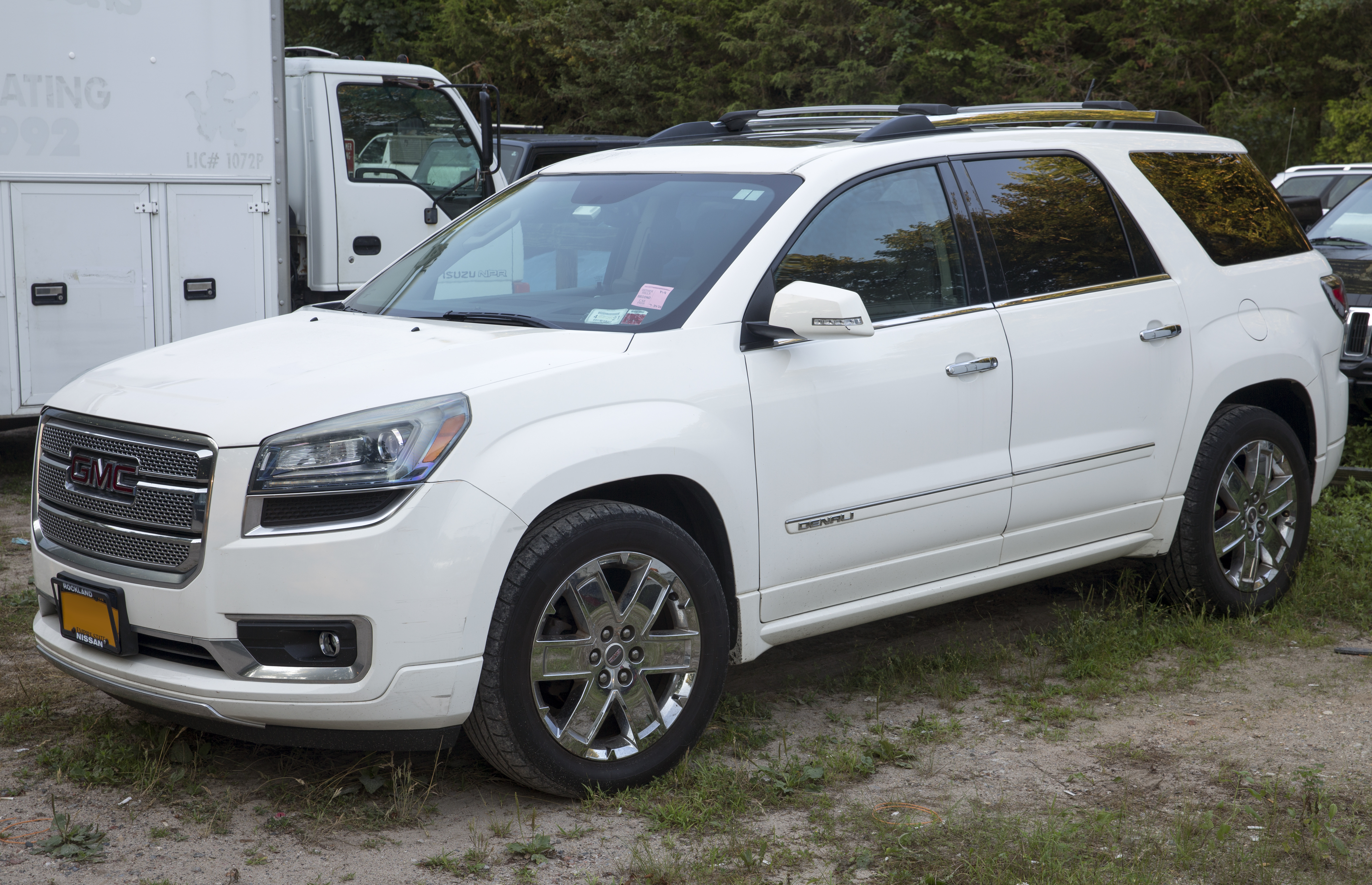
First generation GMC Acadia Denali, refresh for 2013

The Denali version of the Acadia arrived at dealerships in 2010 as 2011 model. This upgraded trim is available in FWD and AWD versions in seven- or eight-passenger form and features monotone paint, honeycomb grille, unique front and rear fascias, along with HID headlamps, chrome accents, exhaust tips, and six-spoke 20-inch wheels. Interior upgrades include perforated leather seating and wood trim.

The Acadia Denali joins its SUV siblings, the Terrain Denali, the Yukon Denali and Yukon XL Denali, and marks GMC's first crossover to take the Denali badge.

=== Trim levels ===
Trim level	Years
SL	2008–2012
SLE	2007–present
SLT	2007–present
Denali	2011–present.

=== Safety ===
A unibody construction helps lower center of gravity, compared to previous truck-based GM SUVs, reduces the risk of rollover accidents. Much of the Acadia's structure is reinforced with high-strength steel, including a steel cross-car beam welded across the floor between the B-pillars.

The Acadia has six different airbags equipped in the vehicle; two dual-stage front air bags for the driver and front passenger, two seat-mounted side-impact air bags in the first row and two head curtain side impact air bags that cover all three seating rows. Similar to the Volvo XC90, the Acadia will have a detection system on board that will deploy various airbags if a rollover is detected.

Additionally, the Acadia comes standard with the OnStar system.

=== Model year updates ===
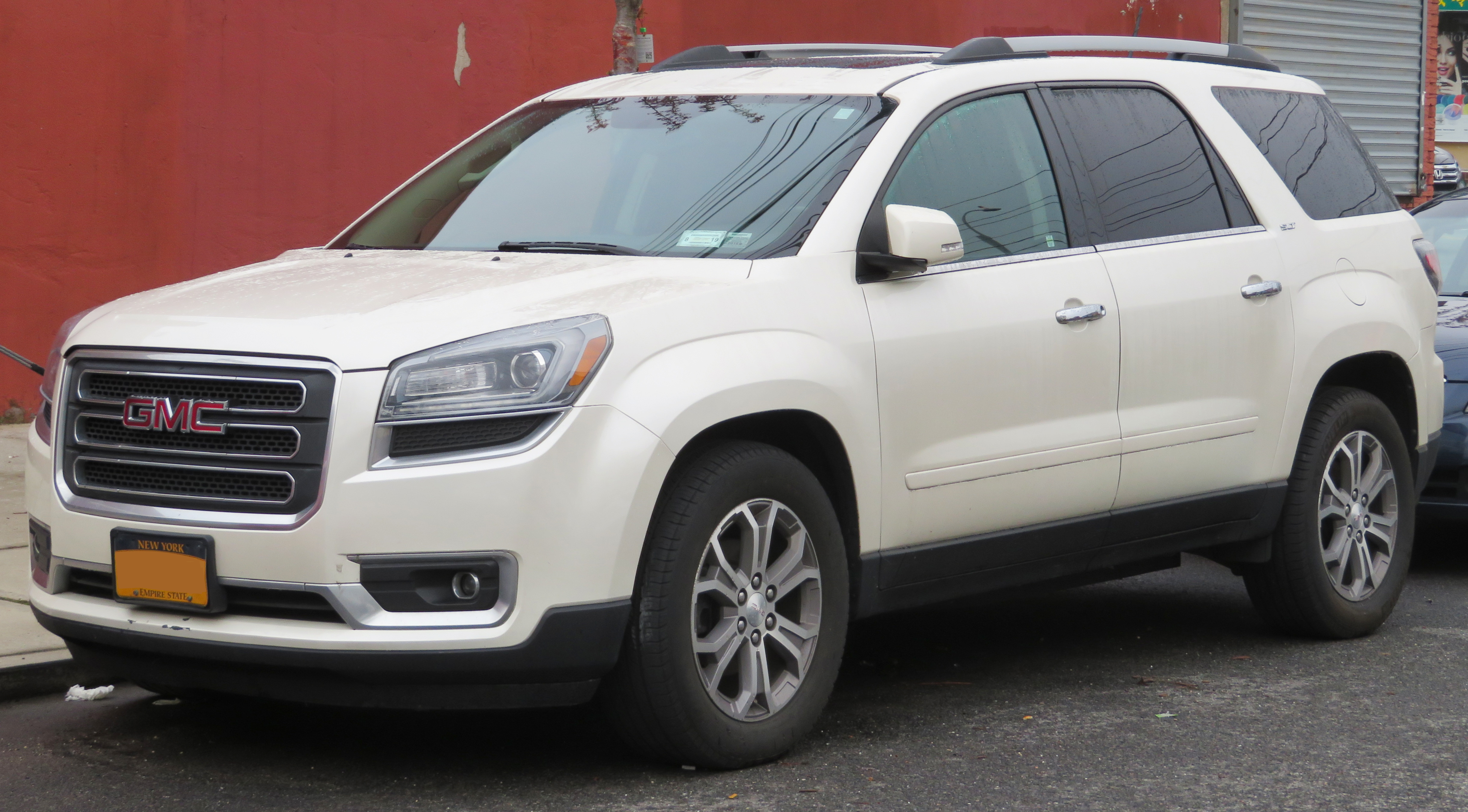
2013 GMC Acadia (facelift)

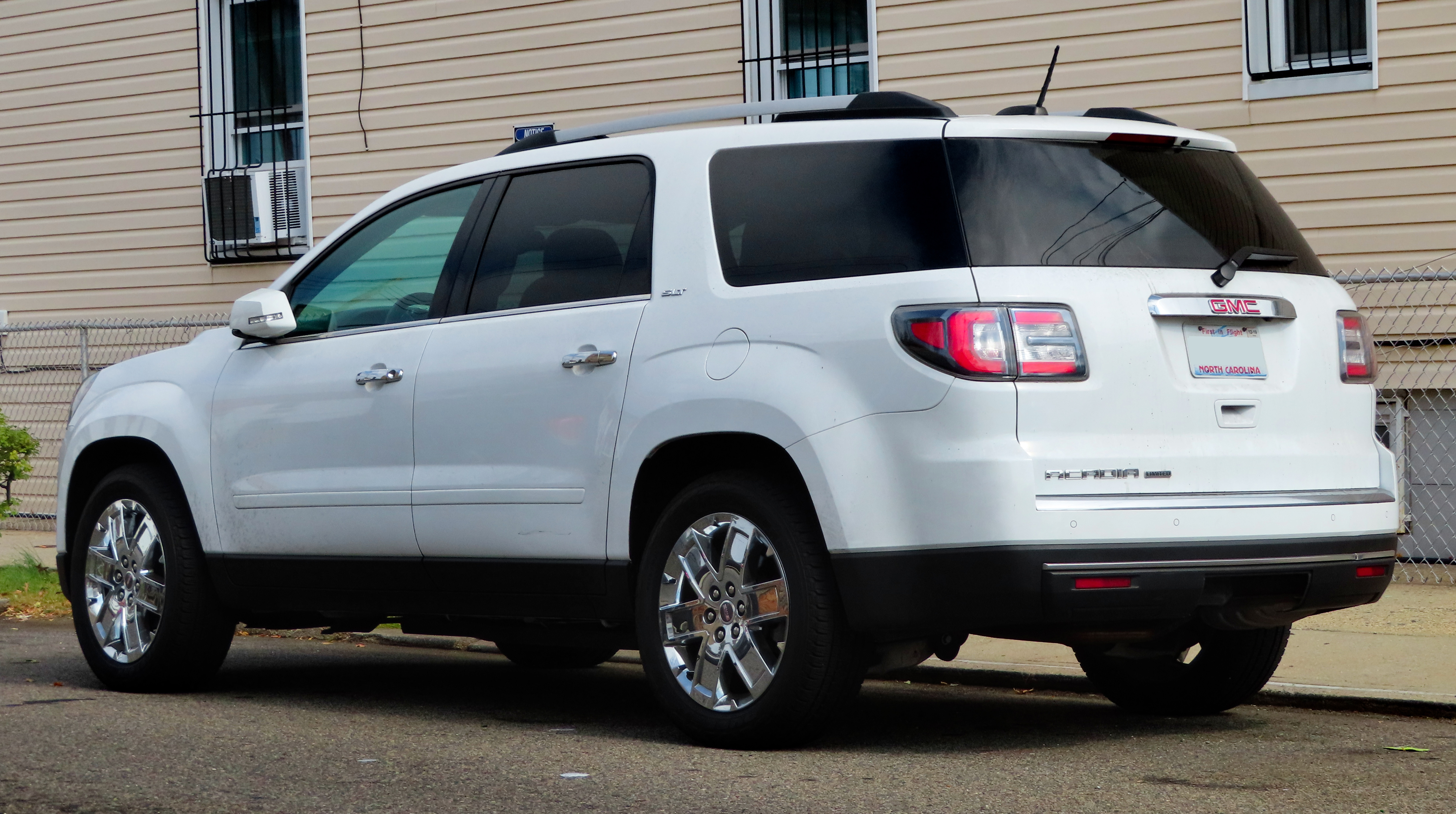
2017 GMC Acadia Limited (rear view, facelift)

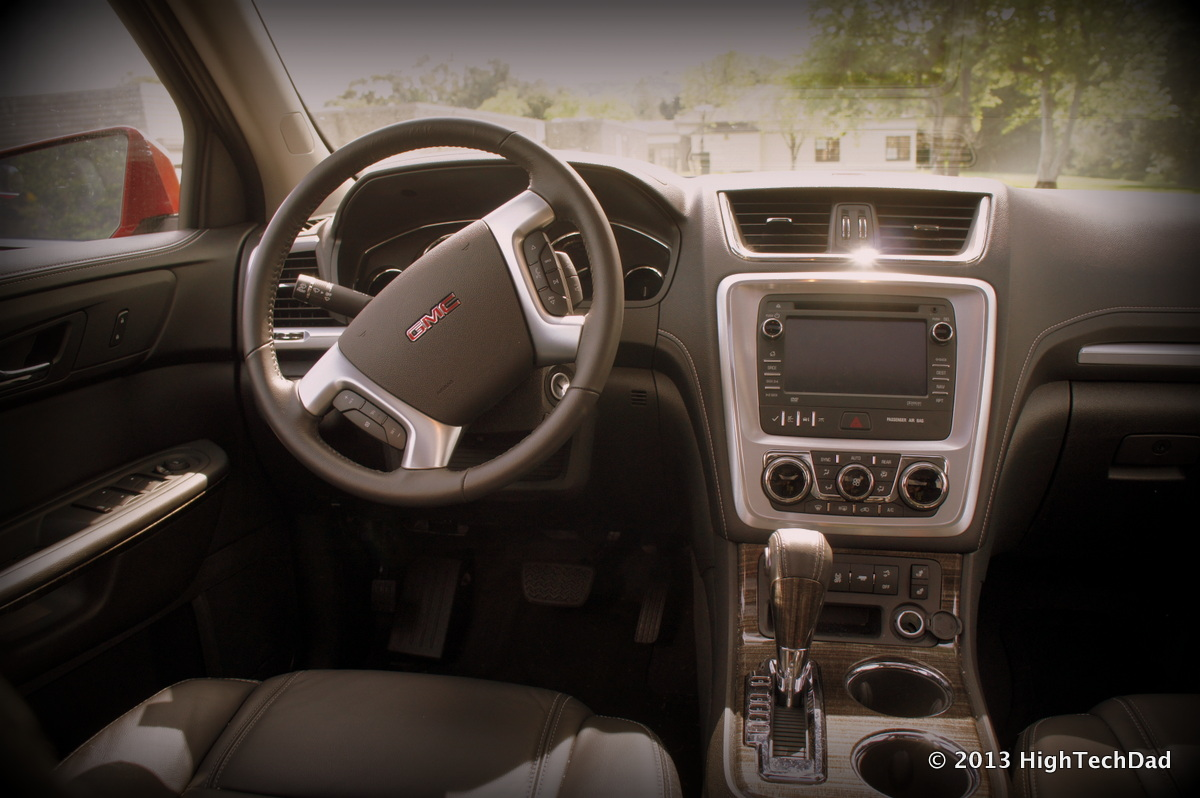
Interior (facelift)

==== 2013 facelift ====
GM unveiled an updated 2013 GMC Acadia at the 2012 Chicago Auto Show, taking the bodyshell of the discontinued Saturn Outlook. The 2013 Acadia received a completely redesigned grille and front fascia, a redesigned rear liftgate, and an improved interior with upgrades to interior quality, as with its other two updated siblings, the Buick Enclave and Chevrolet Traverse.

==== 2014 model year ====
For the 2014 model year, the Acadia added Forward Collision Alert and Lane Departure Warning as a standard on Denali and as an optional feature on SLT1 and SLT2 trims, while two charging-only USB ports on the rear of the center console for second-row use were added as a standard for all trims.

==== 2015 model year ====
For the 2015 model year, a heated, leather-wrapped steering wheel became standard on SLT-2 and Denali models, along with a twenty-inch aluminum wheel design. Crimson Red Tintcoat, Dark Sapphire Blue Metallic, and Midnight Amethyst Metallic are added as new exterior color palettes. In addition, dual exhaust became available only on Denali versions, while all other trim levels received single exhaust.

=== Acadia Limited ===
For the 2017 model year, the first-generation Acadia was sold alongside its second-generation replacement, but was renamed the Acadia Limited, much like the Chevrolet Cruze Limited, Chevrolet Malibu Limited, and Chevrolet Impala Limited were also sold alongside their replacements - at least for a single model year - as rental and fleet vehicles. The Acadia Limited, however, cost more than its ostensible replacement since the new model was significantly downsized, landing between the SLT and Denali models in price. However, production remained in Lansing, Michigan as the second generation Acadia moved to Spring Hill, Tennessee, the site of the original Saturn plant. With the second-generation Buick Enclave and Chevrolet Traverse making their debuts in 2017 as 2018 models, GMC ended production of the Acadia Limited on March 31, 2017, in order to start production on the Traverse and Enclave.

== Second generation (2017) ==
Second generation
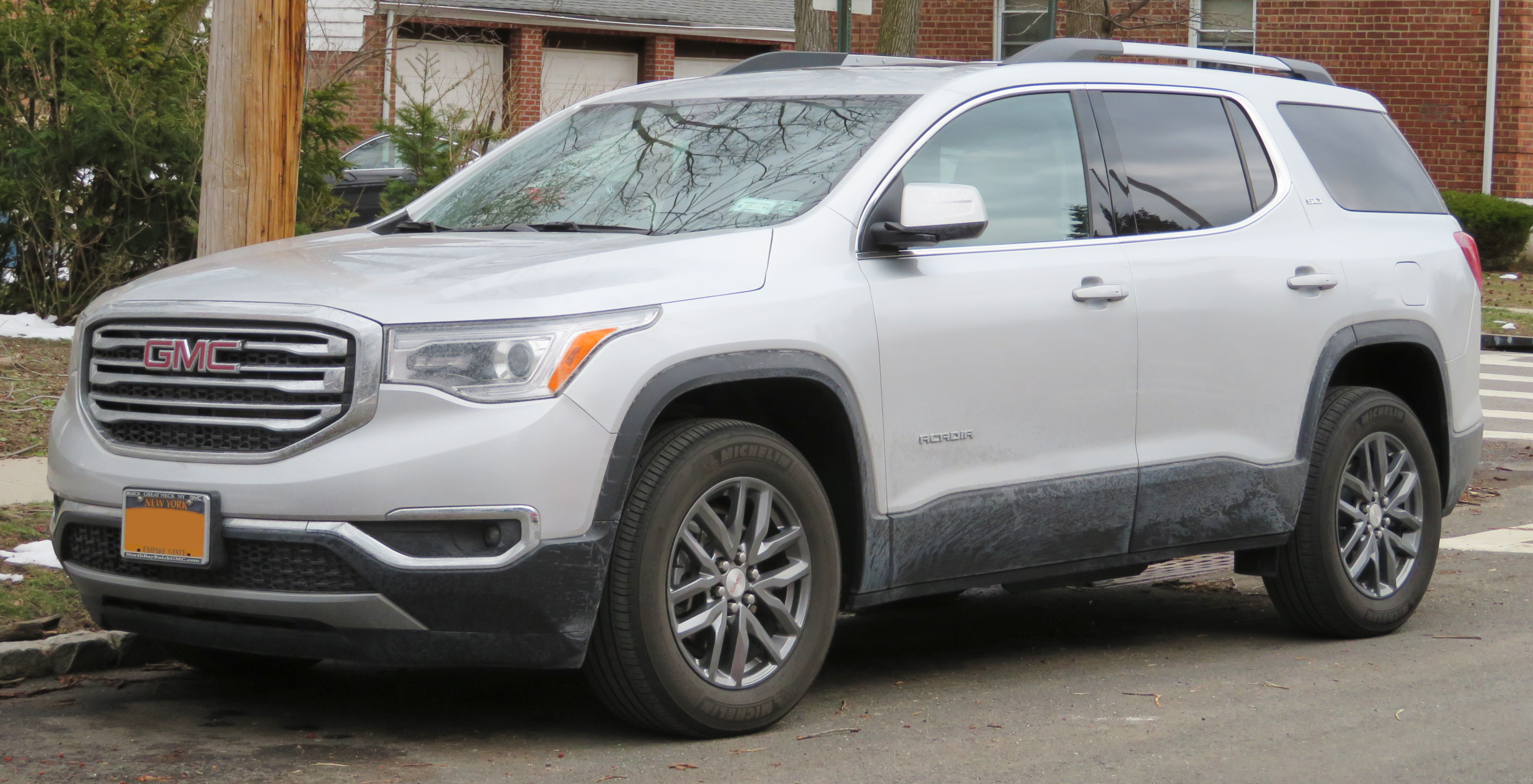
- 2017 GMC Acadia (pre-facelift)

Overview
- Also called: Holden Acadia (Australia/New Zealand)
- Production: 2016–2023
- Model years: 2017–2023; 2018–2020 (Holden Acadia)
- Assembly: United States: Spring Hill, Tennessee (Spring Hill Manufacturing)

Body and chassis
- Platform: GM C1XX
- Related: Buick Enclave; Cadillac XT5; Cadillac XT6; Chevrolet Blazer; Chevrolet Traverse

Powertrain
- Engine: 2.0 L LSY turbo I4 (2020–2023); 2.5 L LCV I4 (2017–2021); 3.6 L LGX V6
- Transmission: 6-speed 6T50/6T70 automatic (2017–2019); 9-speed 9T50/9T65 automatic (2020+)

Dimensions
- Wheelbase: 112.5 in (2,857 mm)
- Length: 193.6 in (4,917 mm)
- Width: 75.4 in (1,915 mm)
- Height: 68.7 in (1,745 mm)

Chronology
- Predecessor: Holden Captiva (Australia and New Zealand, 7-seater only)

The second generation Acadia made its official debut at the North American International Auto Show on January 12, 2016. The redesigned Acadia went on sale in May 2016 as a 2017 model. The second generation Acadia is built in Spring Hill, Tennessee. The previous Acadia continued to be sold alongside the new one as the "Acadia Limited" through the 2017 model year.

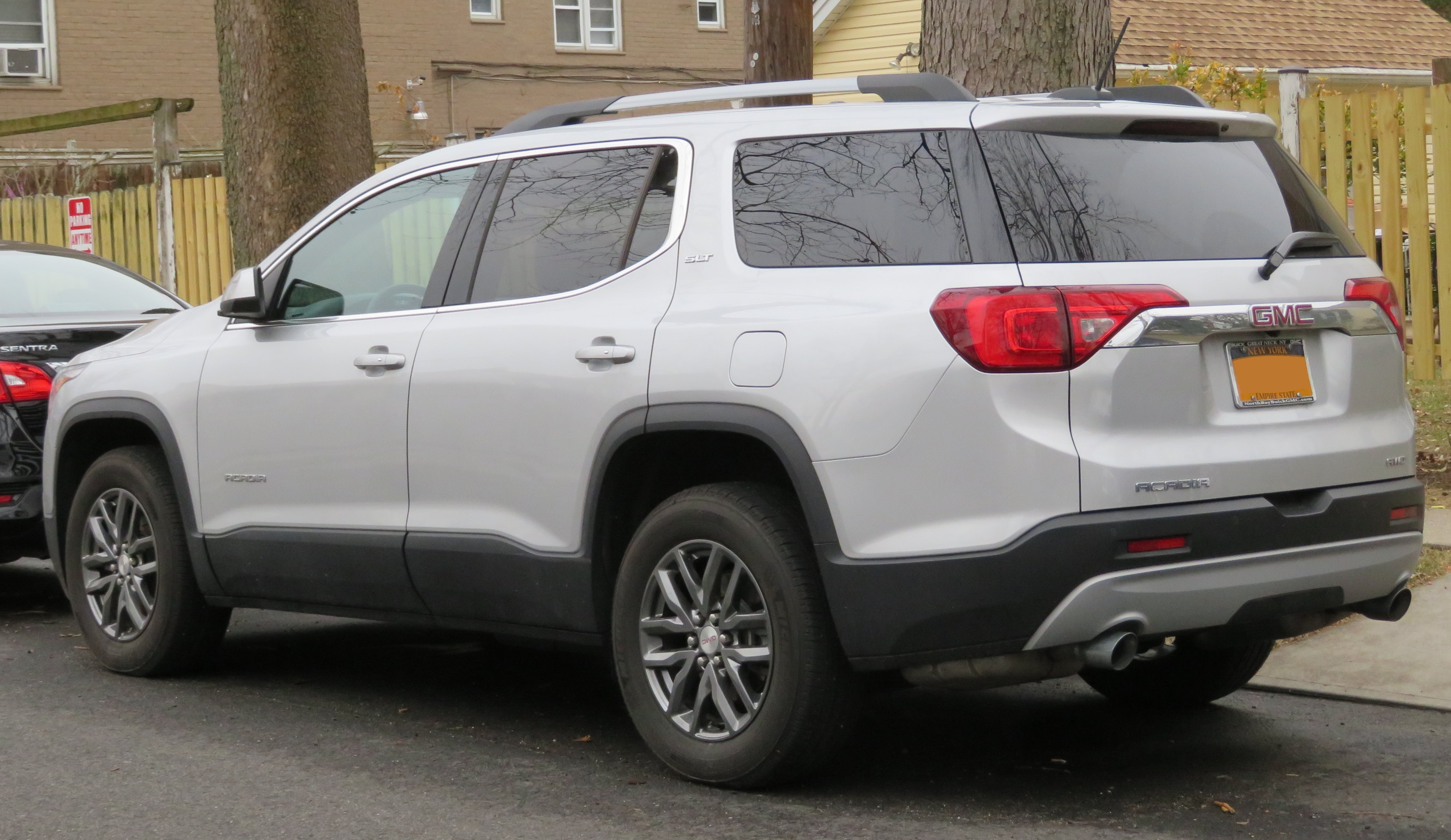
Rear view

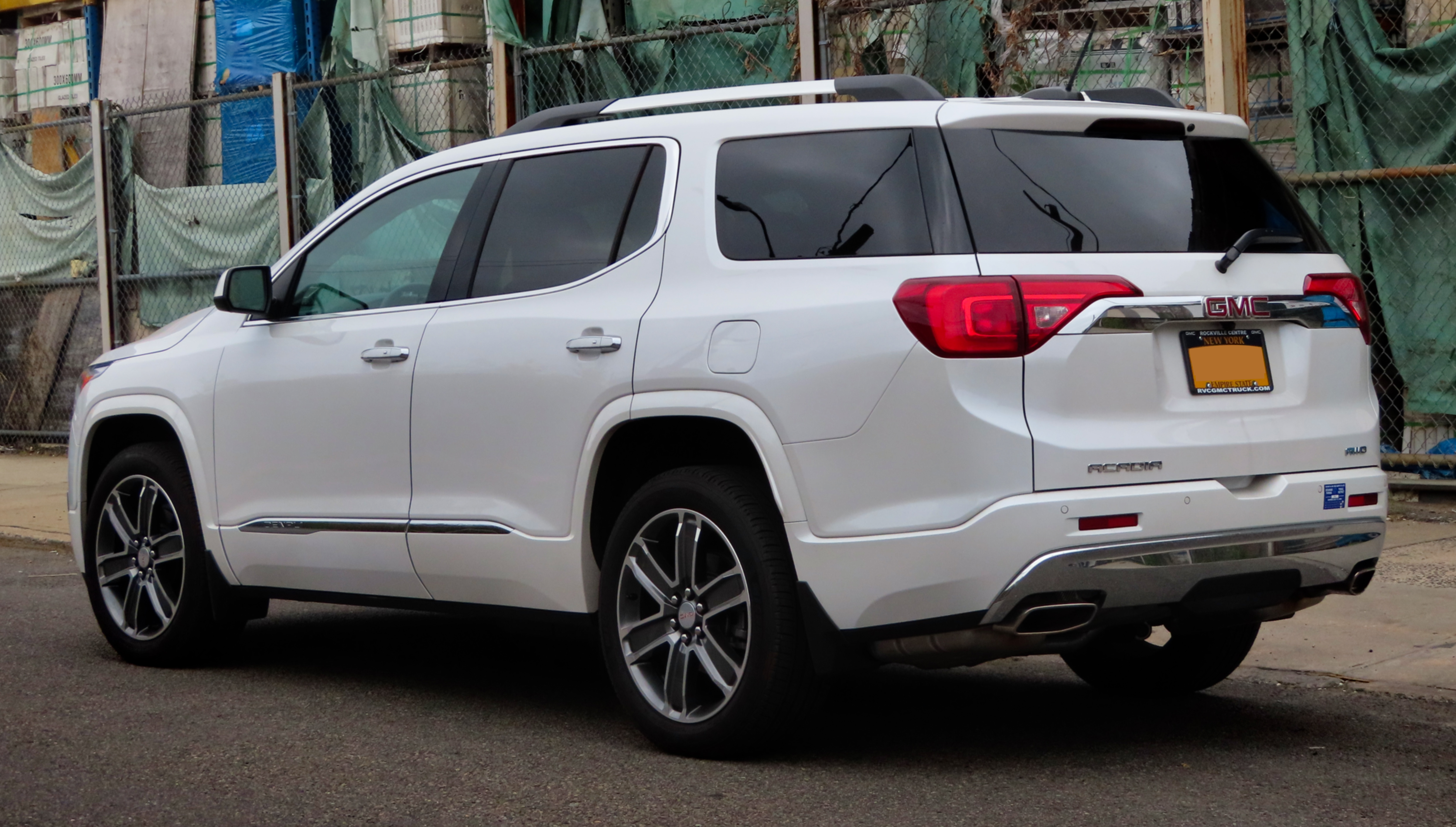
Rear view (Denali)

The second generation Acadia was reduced from 200.8 in (5,100 mm) to 193.6 in (4,917 mm) in length and from 78.9 in (2,004 mm) to 75.4 in (1,915 mm) in width (losing 700 pounds (320 kg) in the process), as GM repositioned the vehicle to mid-size status while remaining above the Terrain in size (the Terrain itself would relinquish its midsize status after it was repositioned as a second generation smaller compact crossover with the 2018 model), as GM has already announced that the next generation Traverse and Enclave will be the only GM-built full-size crossover SUVs in this segment. With the reduction from full-size to mid-size, the Acadia's MSRP was reduced to $29,995 (US). The GMC Acadia now has 5, 6, and 7 passenger configurations arranged respectively like either two front bucket seats and one rear bench seat; two bucket seats up front, two buckets in the second row, and two seats in the rear row; or two front bucket seats, one second row bench seat, and two rear seats in the third row.

The second generation Acadia features seven seats instead of eight, a choice of either a 2.5-liter or 3.6-liter engine, a new advanced twin-clutch AWD system (available only with All-Terrain package) by GKN Driveline designed for off-road environment (joining the FWD and AWD drivetrains available on all other models), an updated fascia and redesigned lighting. The Acadia is built on the same platform as the Cadillac XT5 and will be joined by the Chinese-built Buick Envision and the Chevrolet Blazer (built on the C1XX platform) when GM unveils its lineup for its mid-size CUVs for 2018 and beyond.

With the decrease in size, fuel economy with the 3.6L increases to 18 mpg_{‑US} (13 L/100 km) city, 25 mpg_{‑US} (9.4 L/100 km) hwy (AWD and FWD) from 17 mpg_{‑US} (14 L/100 km) city 24 mpg_{‑US} (9.8 L/100 km) hwy (FWD). The 2017 Acadia will offer the newly launched AppShop feature.

Trim levels for the second generation Acadia were carried over from the previous generation; SL, SLE-1, SLE-2, SLT-1, SLT-2, as well as a Denali trim level, though an All-Terrain Package is available on Acadia SLE and SLT trim levels that will be more rugged in its appearance. The second generation Acadia is also available with Third Row Seat Delete option on SLE and SLT trim levels as part of the All-Terrain Package.

The second generation Acadia introduced a feature to remind drivers to check the rear seats for children to help prevent heatstroke of children accidentally left behind in a vehicle.

=== Holden Acadia ===
The Acadia was marketed in Australia and New Zealand as a Holden-badged vehicle. It went on sale on November 12, 2018. The Holden Acadia was built in Tennessee with RHD specifications, and marketed as a full-size CUV. The Acadia was chosen for Australian exports due to its smaller size compared to its Chevrolet and Buick counterparts, which are the Traverse and Enclave respectively.

The Holden Acadia was due to receive an update for 2020 like the GMC Acadia, but it was canceled due to the Holden brand being phased out in 2020. A total of 5,157 units were sold during its sales period.

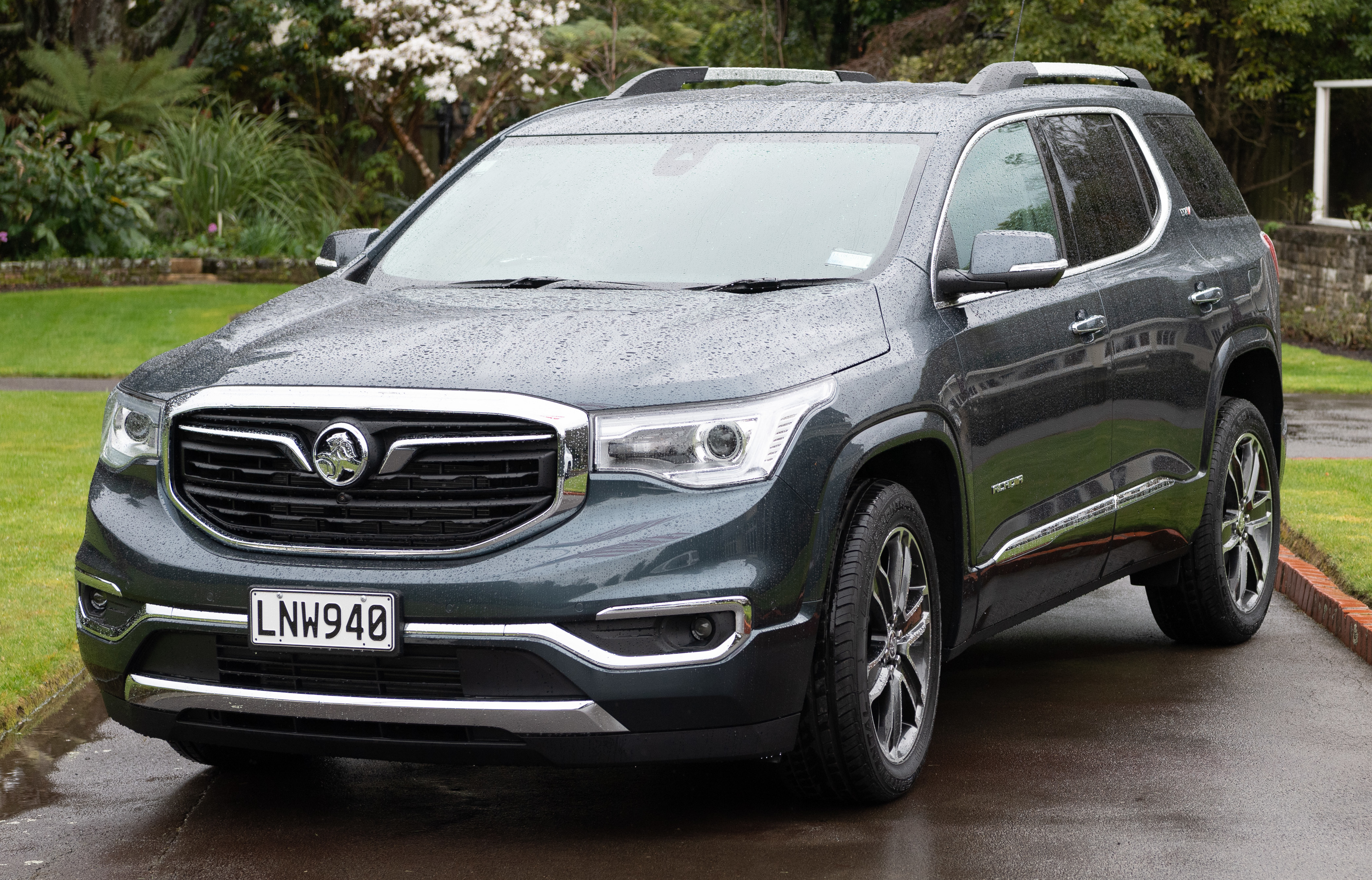
Holden Acadia (front)

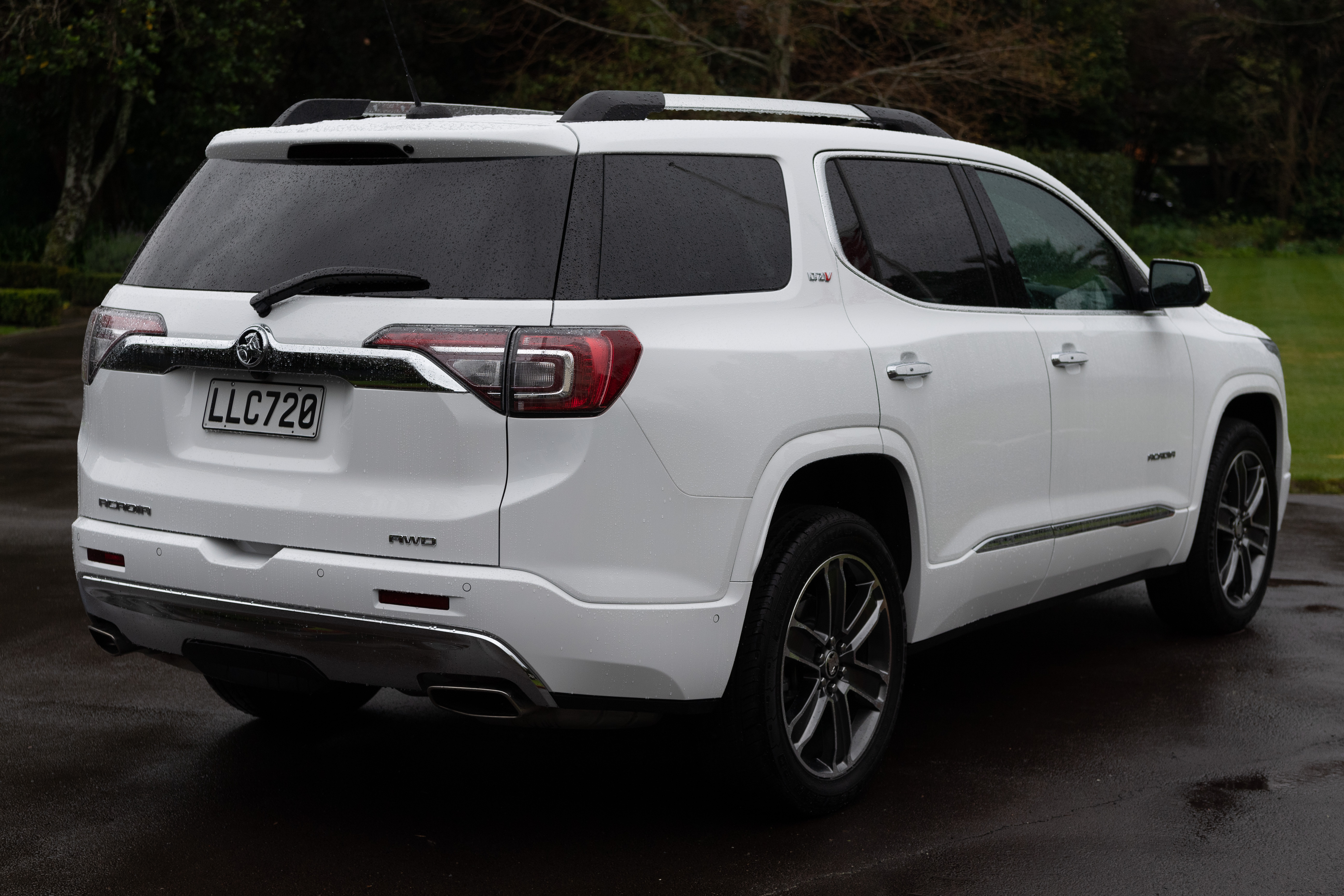
Holden Acadia (rear)

=== Model year updates ===
==== 2020 facelift ====
The GMC Acadia received a facelift for 2020. The facelift introduced new exterior styling (including a new front grille inspired by the all-new 2019 GMC Sierra 1500), a revised infotainment system with Apple CarPlay and Android Auto smartphone integration, new alloy wheel options, an all-new AT4 trim level (which replaces the All-Terrain Package on select trim levels), a new 2.0L turbocharged EcoTec inline four-cylinder (I4) engine (both the 2.5L EcoTec I4 and 3.6L VVT V6 engine options remain available for 2020), and the Electronic Precision Shift push-button automatic transmission that was first introduced on the 2018 GMC Terrain, this shifter was paired to a new 9-speed automatic, among other changes. The 2020 GMC Acadia went on sale in the fall of 2019.

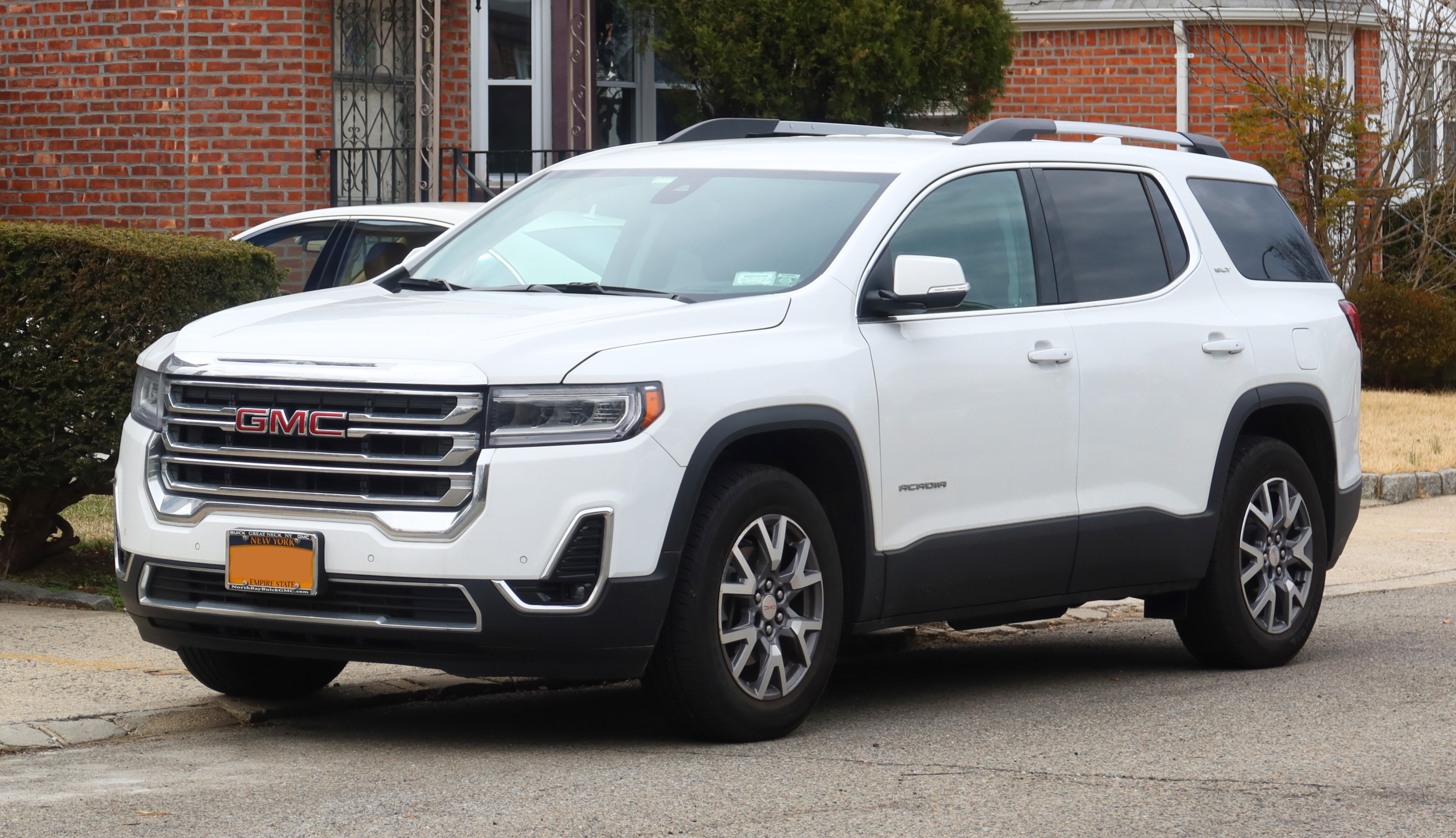
2020 GMC Acadia SLT

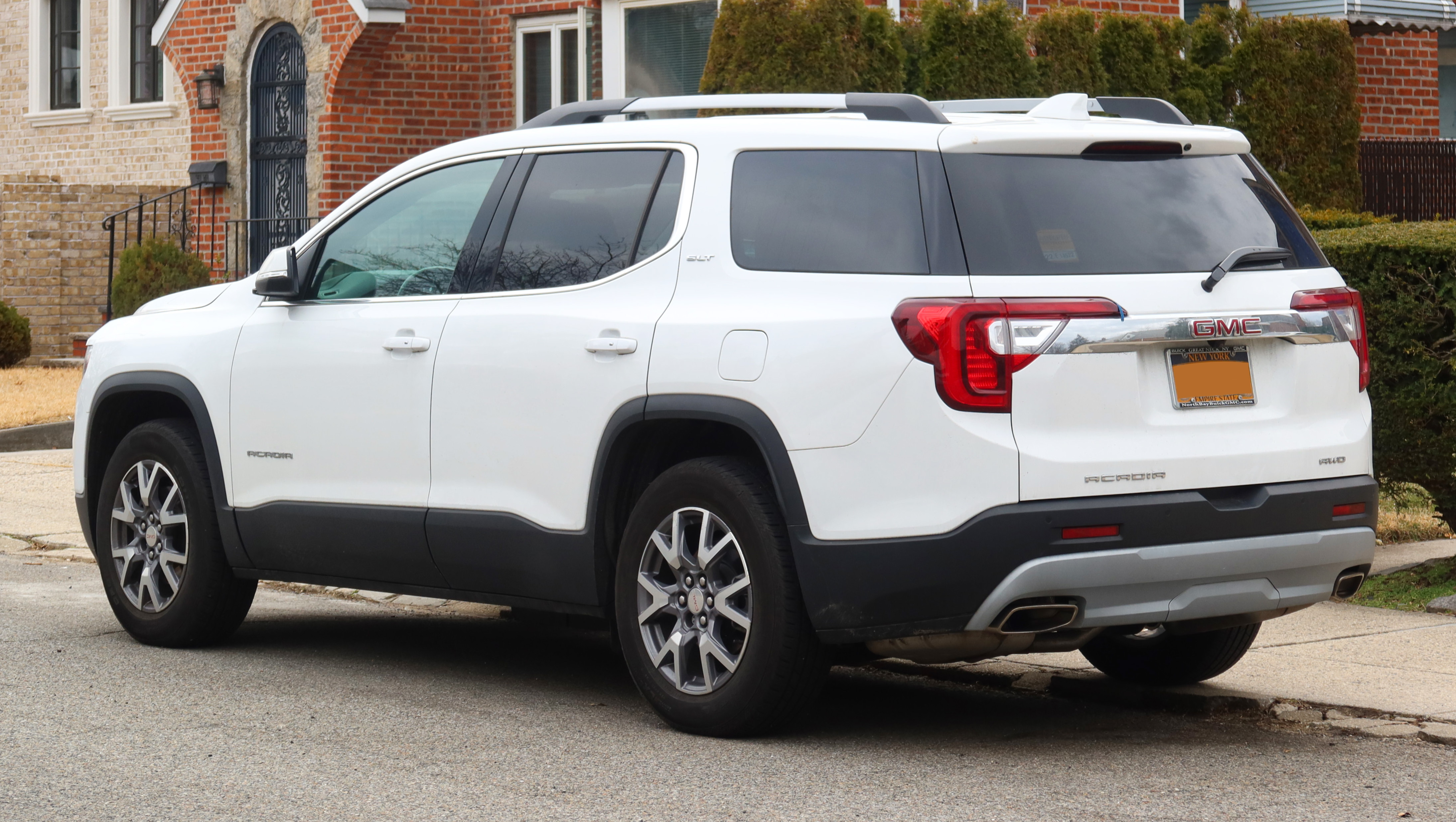
2020 GMC Acadia SLT

==== 2021 ====
GMC introduced some minor changes for the 2021 model year. Wireless functionality for Apple CarPlay and Android Auto was added, as well as the debut of an Elevation Edition package that adds black exterior styling accents and 20-inch wheels.

==== 2022 ====
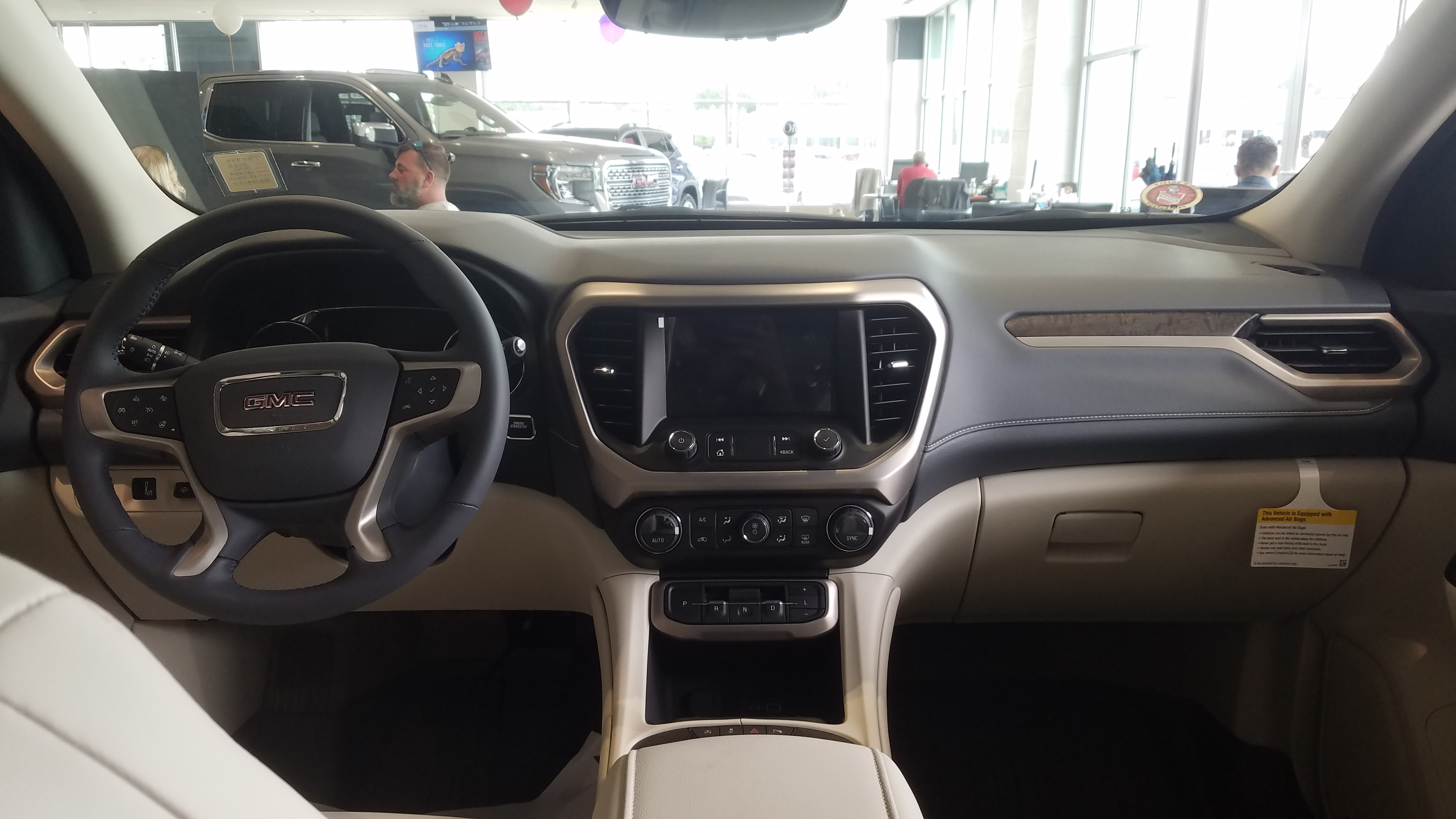
Interior (facelift)

The GMC Acadia received a few updates for 2022, the most notable was the discontinuation of the 2.5 LCV I4 engine, which was standard on lower trim levels, the new standard engine became the turbocharged 2.0L LSY I4 while the 3.6L V6 LGX will still be available as an option. All engines were still paired to a 9-speed automatic transmission. The base SL trim level was also dropped, this made the SLE the base model from 2022 onwards. The five-passenger seating option was also discontinued for 2022, this configuration was only offered in the AT4 trim level, and removed the third row seats entirely.

=== Safety ===
The second-generation Acadia did not receive the "Top Safety Pick" awarded by IIHS, unlike the Traverse, because the two available headlight setups received a Marginal rating.

IIHS scores (2021)
Small overlap front (driver)	Good	
Small overlap front (passenger)	Good	
Moderate overlap front (original test)	Good	
Side (original test)	Good	
Side (updated test)	Poor	
Roof strength	Good	
Head restraints and seats	Good	
Headlights	Marginal	
Front crash prevention: vehicle-to-pedestrian	Superior	Advanced
Child seat anchors (LATCH) ease of use	Acceptable	

ANCAP test results Holden Acadia all variants (2018, aligned with Euro NCAP)
Test	Points	%
Overall:	5 /5 stars	
Adult occupant:	35.8	94%
Child occupant:	42.8	87%
Pedestrian:	35.8	74%
Safety assist:	11.2	86%

== Third generation (2024) ==
Third generation
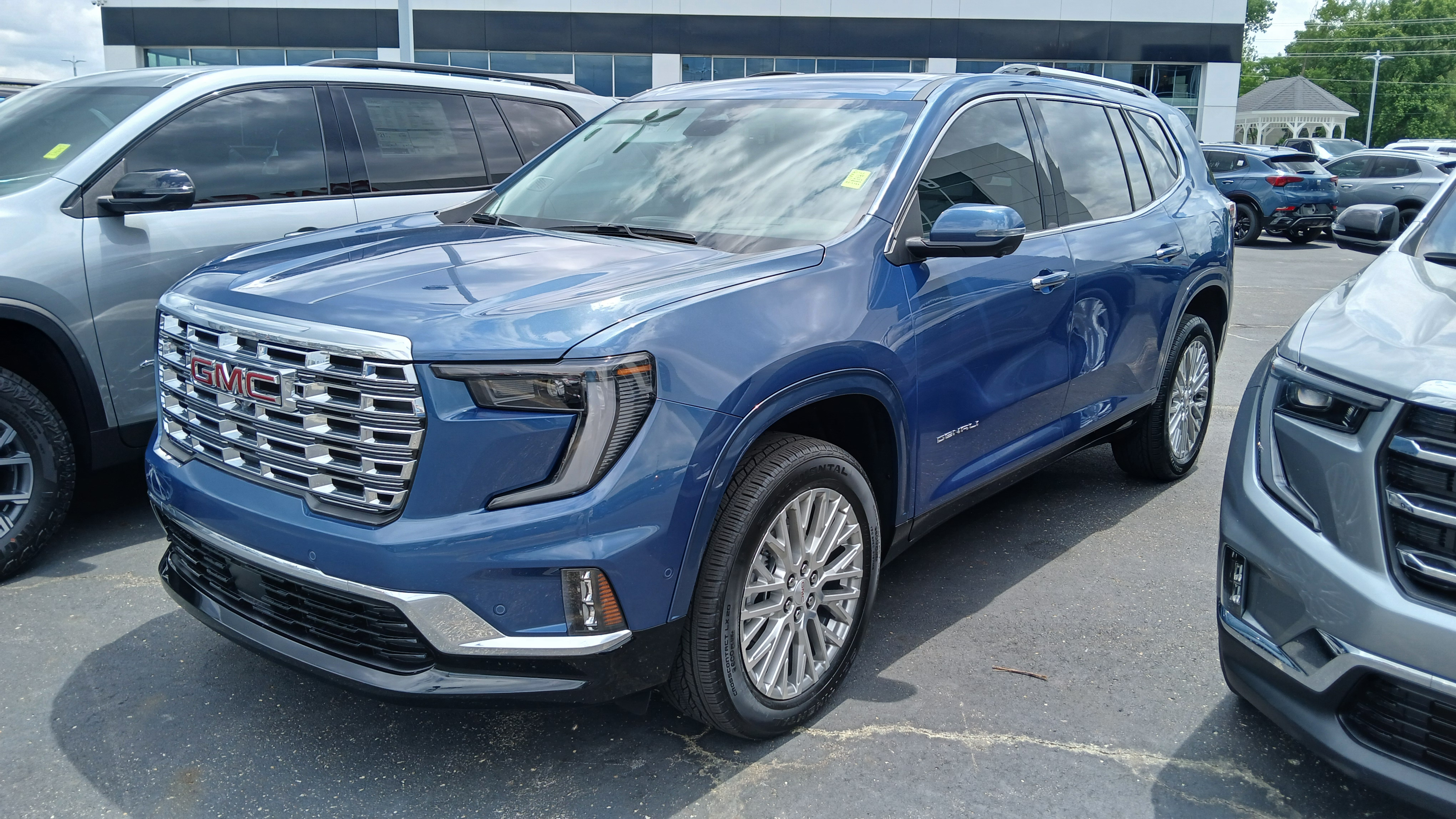
- 2024 GMC Acadia Denali in Downpour (Blue) Metallic

Overview
- Production: March 2024–present
- Model years: 2024–present 2026–present (South Korea)
- Assembly: United States: Lansing, Michigan (Lansing Delta Township Assembly)

Body and chassis
- Platform: GM VSS-S (C1XX-2)
- Related: Buick Enclave; Chevrolet Traverse

Powertrain
- Engine: 2.5 L LK0 turbo I4 (gasoline)
- Transmission: 8-speed automatic

Dimensions
- Wheelbase: 120.9 in (3,070 mm)
- Length: 203.9 in (5,179 mm)
- Width: 79.6 in (2,022 mm)
- Height: 70.9 in (1,801 mm)
- Curb weight: ≥ 4,800 lb (2,177 kg)

The 2024 Acadia was revealed at the 2023 North American International Auto Show. The Acadia was sized back up to a full-size to allow it to compete better in the three row crossover segment. With seating for up to 7 or 8, it shares its wheelbase with the larger Yukon.

Built on the same VSS-S platform as the related third-generation Chevrolet Traverse, the third-generation Acadia is powered exclusively by a 2.5-liter, turbocharged inline-four gasoline engine producing 328 hp (245 kW), and 326 lb⋅ft (442 N⋅m) of torque (an increase of 18 horsepower and 55 lb. ft. of torque over the previous-generation Acadia's naturally-aspirated 3.6-liter V6 engine). Standard on all trims will be a 15-inch tablet-style infotainment system and an 11-inch reconfigurable instrument cluster display. The Acadia has a seating capacity of seven or eight passengers with dual second-row captain's chairs or a second row bench seat depending on the model. The 2024 Acadia, which arrived in early 2024, was available in four models: base Elevation (replacing the previous SLE trim), mid-level Elevation Premium (replacing the previous SLT trim), off-road oriented AT4, and premium Denali. General Motors "Super Cruise" semi-autonomous driving system was available on most models for the first time.

For the third-generation model, assembly of the 2024 Acadia was moved back to the Lansing Delta Township Assembly Plant in Michigan from the previous Saturn Corporation Spring Hill Manufacturing Plant in Tennessee, joining the all-new 2024 Chevrolet Traverse, and the 2025 Buick Enclave.

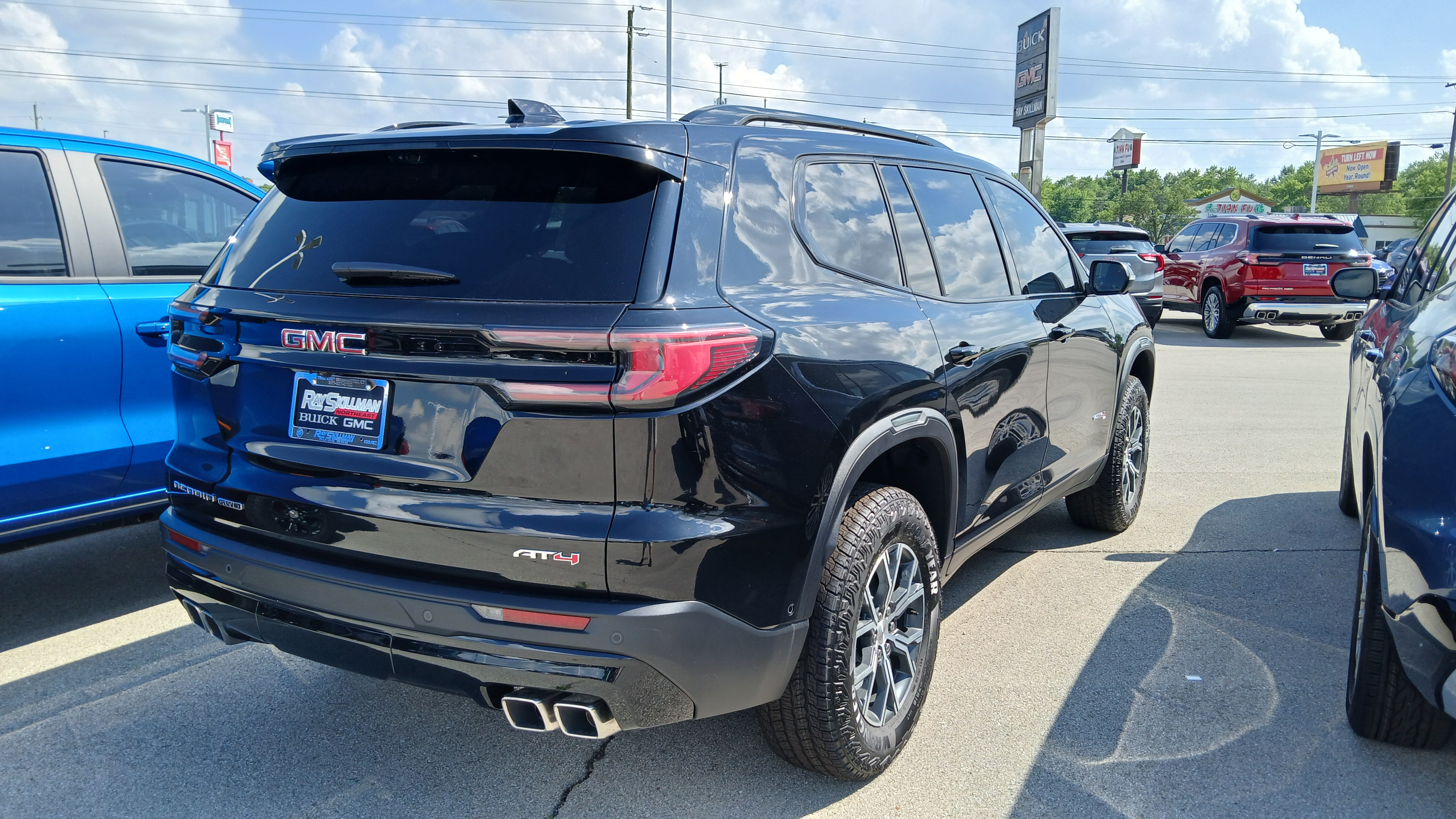
Rear view (Acadia AT4)

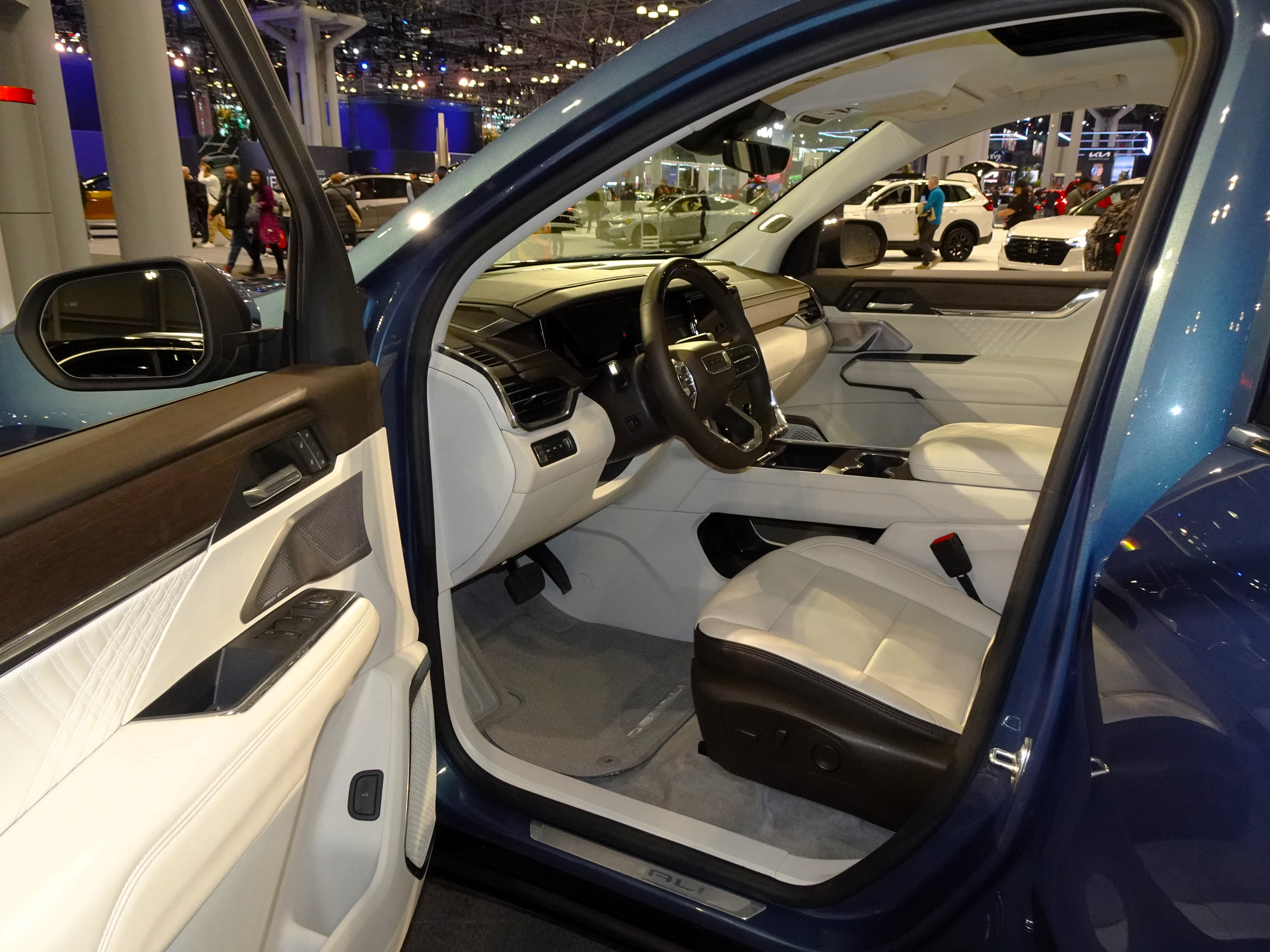
Interior

=== Safety ===
The 2025 Acadia was awarded "Top Safety Pick" by IIHS.

IIHS scores (2025)
Small overlap front	Good	
Moderate overlap front (updated test)	Acceptable	
Side (updated test)	Good	
Headlights	Good	Marginal
Front crash prevention: vehicle-to-vehicle 2.0	Good	
Front crash prevention: vehicle-to-pedestrian	Acceptable	
Seatbelt reminders	Good	

== Sales ==
Year	U.S.	Canada	Australia
2006	480		
2007	72,765	6,067	
2008	66,440	5,844	
2009	53,820	4,197	
2010	68,295	5,047	
2011	79,288	5,207	
2012	78,280	4,899	
2013	89,793	4,741	
2014	83,972	5,973	
2015	96,393	6,452	
2016	88,466	3,939	
2017	111,276	5,380	
2018	88,621	5,156	625
2019	99,429	4,357	3,125
2020	72,537	3,109	1,407
2021	59,913	3,485	
2022	53,014	3,420	
2023	66,322	4,961	
2024	49,178	3,321	
2025	55,221	5,503	
