= Hyundai Ioniq 6 =

Battery electric mid-size sedan

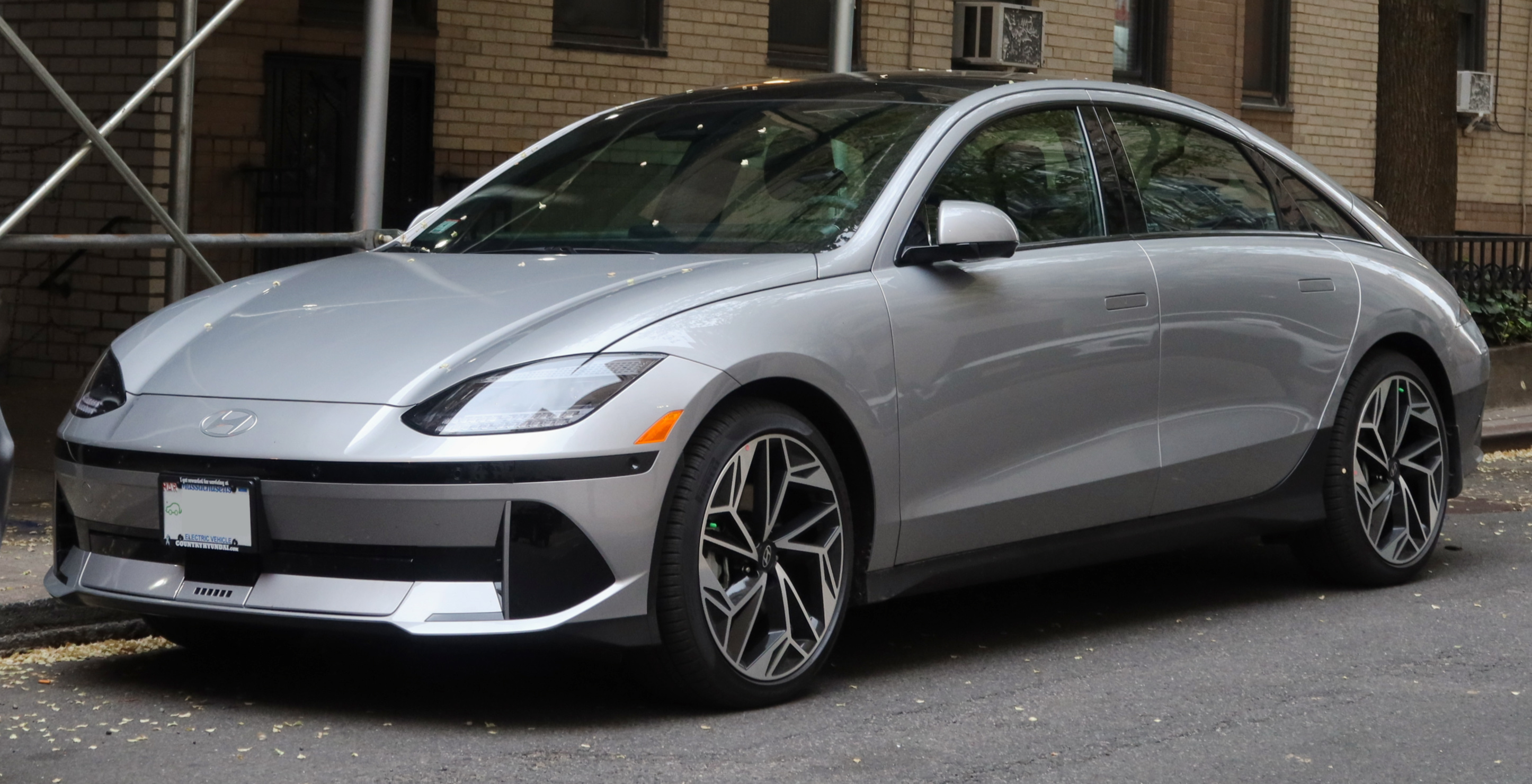
- 2023 Hyundai Ioniq 6 Limited (pre-facelift)

Overview
- Manufacturer: Hyundai
- Model code: CE
- Production: July 2022 – present
- Model years: 2023–present 2023–2025 (US)
- Assembly: South Korea: Asan (Asan Plant); Singapore: Jurong (HMGICS)
- Designer: Under the lead of SangYup Lee

Body and chassis
- Class: Mid-size car
- Body style: 4-door fastback sedan
- Layout: Rear-motor, rear-wheel-drive; Dual-motor, all-wheel-drive
- Platform: Hyundai E-GMP
- Related: Hyundai Ioniq 5; Hyundai Ioniq 9; Kia EV6; Kia EV9; Genesis GV60

Powertrain
- Electric motor: EM07/EM17 permanent magnet synchronous
- Battery: 53–77.4 kWh NMC lithium-ion (pre-facelift); 63–84 kWh (facelift); 84 kWh (Ioniq 6 N)
- Electric range: Up to 614 km (382 mi) (WLTP:pre-facelift); Up to 680 km (423 mi) (WLTP:facelift); Up to 487 km (303 mi) (WLTP:Ioniq6 N)
- Plug-in charging: 11 kW (AC) 233 kW (DC) (pre-facelift); With 350 kW, 10% to 80% in about 18 minutes (facelift, IONIQ 6 N)

Dimensions
- Wheelbase: 2,950 mm (116.1 in) (pre-facelift and facelift); 2,965 mm (116.7 in) (Ioniq 6 N)
- Length: 4,855 mm (191.1 in) (pre-facelift); 4,925 mm (193.9 in) (facelift); 4,930 mm (194.1 in) (facelift N Line); 4,935 mm (194.3 in) (Ioniq 6 N)
- Width: 1,880 mm (74.0 in) (pre-facelift, facelift); 1,940 mm (76.4 in) (Ioniq 6 N)
- Height: 1,495 mm (58.9 in)
- Curb weight: 1,800–2,096 kg (3,968–4,621 lb) (pre-facelift); 2,166–2,201 kg (4,775–4,852 lb) (Ioniq 6 N)

The Hyundai Ioniq 6 (Korean: 현대 아이오닉 6) is a battery electric mid-size fastback sedan produced by Hyundai Motor Company. It is the second vehicle marketed under the electric car-focused Ioniq sub-brand after the Ioniq 5, and the fourth model developed on the Hyundai Electric Global Modular Platform (E-GMP). The vehicle was first sold in South Korea in late 2022, with deliveries in the United States beginning in March 2023. A facelifted model and the high-performance Ioniq 6 N were introduced in 2025.

== Overview ==
The exterior and interior design of the Ioniq 6 was first revealed on 29 June 2022, followed by its digital world premiere and physical debut at the Busan International Motor Show on 14 July. Pre-orders in South Korea began on 22 August 2022, with deliveries starting in South Korea and selected European markets later that year. For the United States market, production started in January 2023, with sales beginning in March. The vehicle is produced at Hyundai Motor Company's Asan plant in South Korea, which also produces the Sonata and Grandeur starting in the third quarter of 2022.

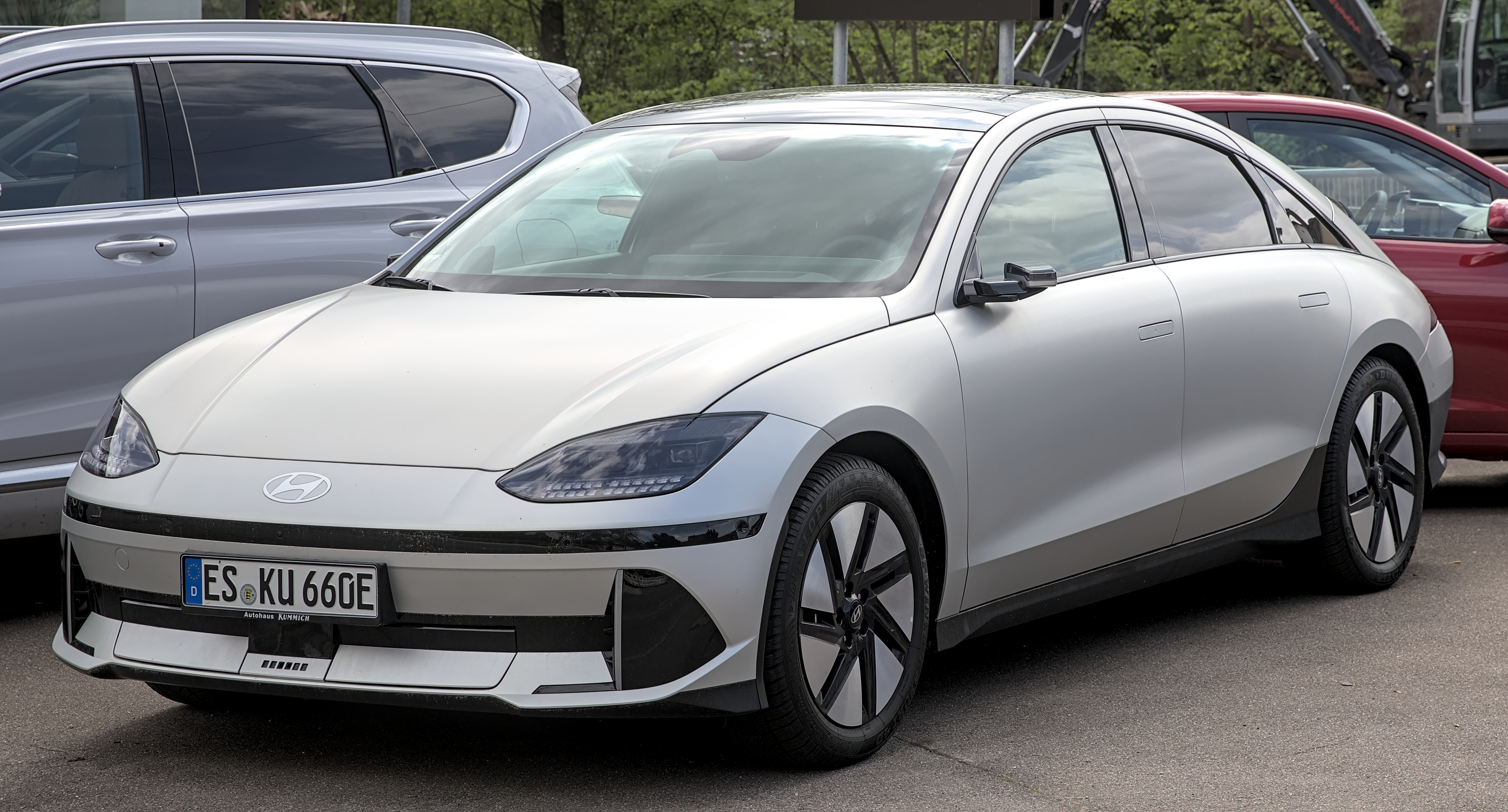
2023 Ioniq 6 (pre-facelift)

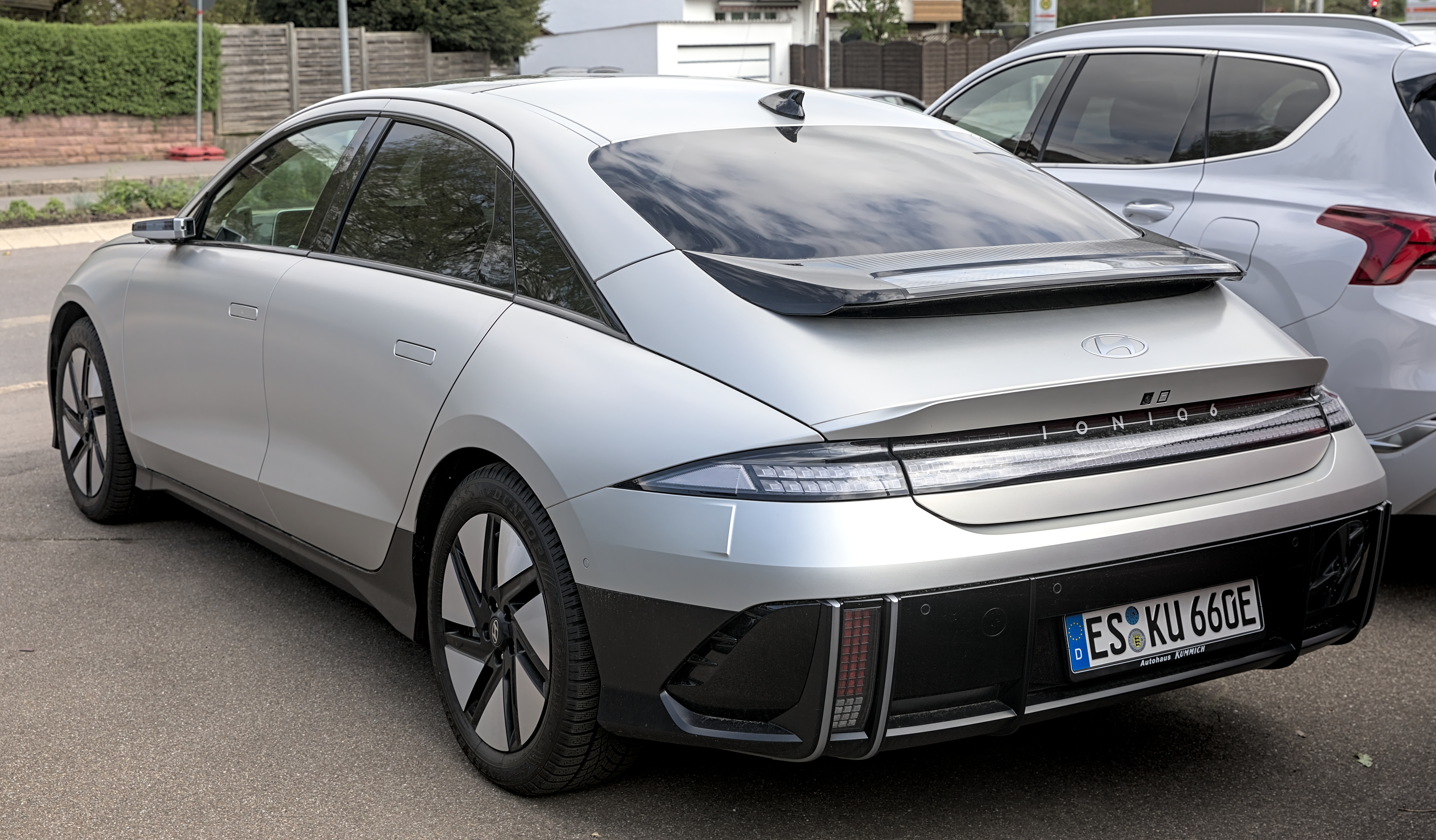
Rear view (pre-facelift)

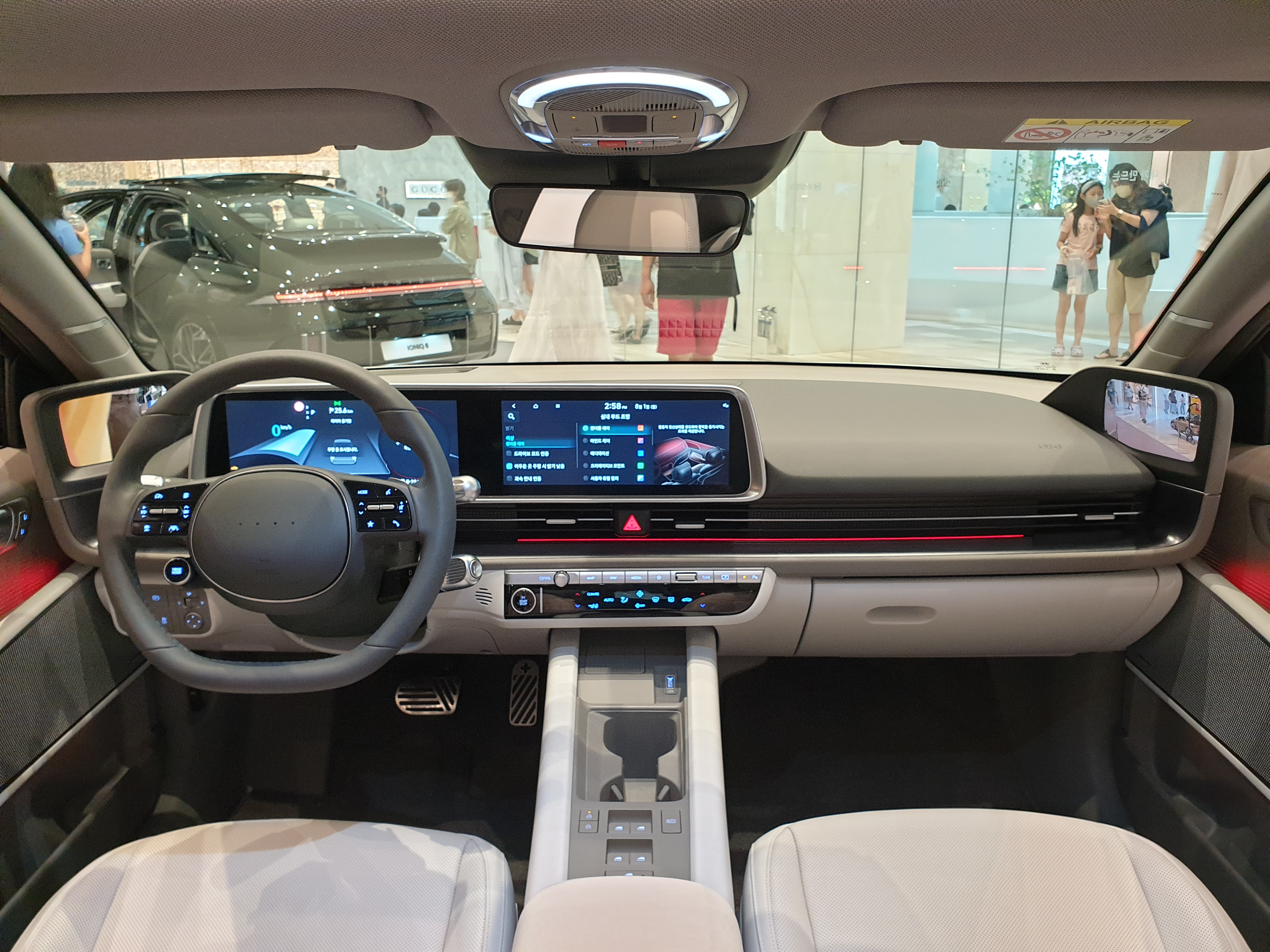
Interior (pre-facelift)

=== Design development ===
The Ioniq 6 was developed under the codename CE. It was previewed by the Prophecy concept car which was showcased in March 2020.

A design sketch was released first as a teaser image on 21 June 2022. The concept sketch of the car represented the "Electrified Streamliner" design approach, built on Hyundai's new E-GMP platform; the sketch showed a soft streamlined design that minimizes wind resistance. A long wheelbase was applied compared to the overall height.

A series of photos showing details were released in the days leading up to 29 June 2022, when an overall photograph of the Ioniq 6 was unveiled.

Similar to the Ioniq 5, the "Parametric Pixel" design is applied to the front lights. In addition, the Ioniq 6 is the first vehicle to use Hyundai's new stylized-H emblem, which was manufactured in the form of a thin plane made of aluminium. The side profile incorporates a streamlined window line, a built-in flush door handle, and optional side-mounted Digital Side Mirror (DSM) replacing conventional side mirrors. Attention to these and other aerodynamic details such as rear spoilers, external active air flaps, and wheel air curtains were credited for lowering the coefficient of drag to 0.21. The rear of the vehicle combines the rear spoiler with parametric pixel auxiliary braking light.

Hyundai Executive Vice President SangYup Lee, who leads the Hyundai Design Centre, described the interior as "a mindful cocoon that offers personalized place for all". The extended interior space is created by the vehicle's long wheelbase. The vehicle function operation unit was designed to be centralized and the storage space was expanded by applying a bridge-type centre console. In addition, eco-friendly materials were applied to interior and exterior painting, sheets, dashboards, and headliners.

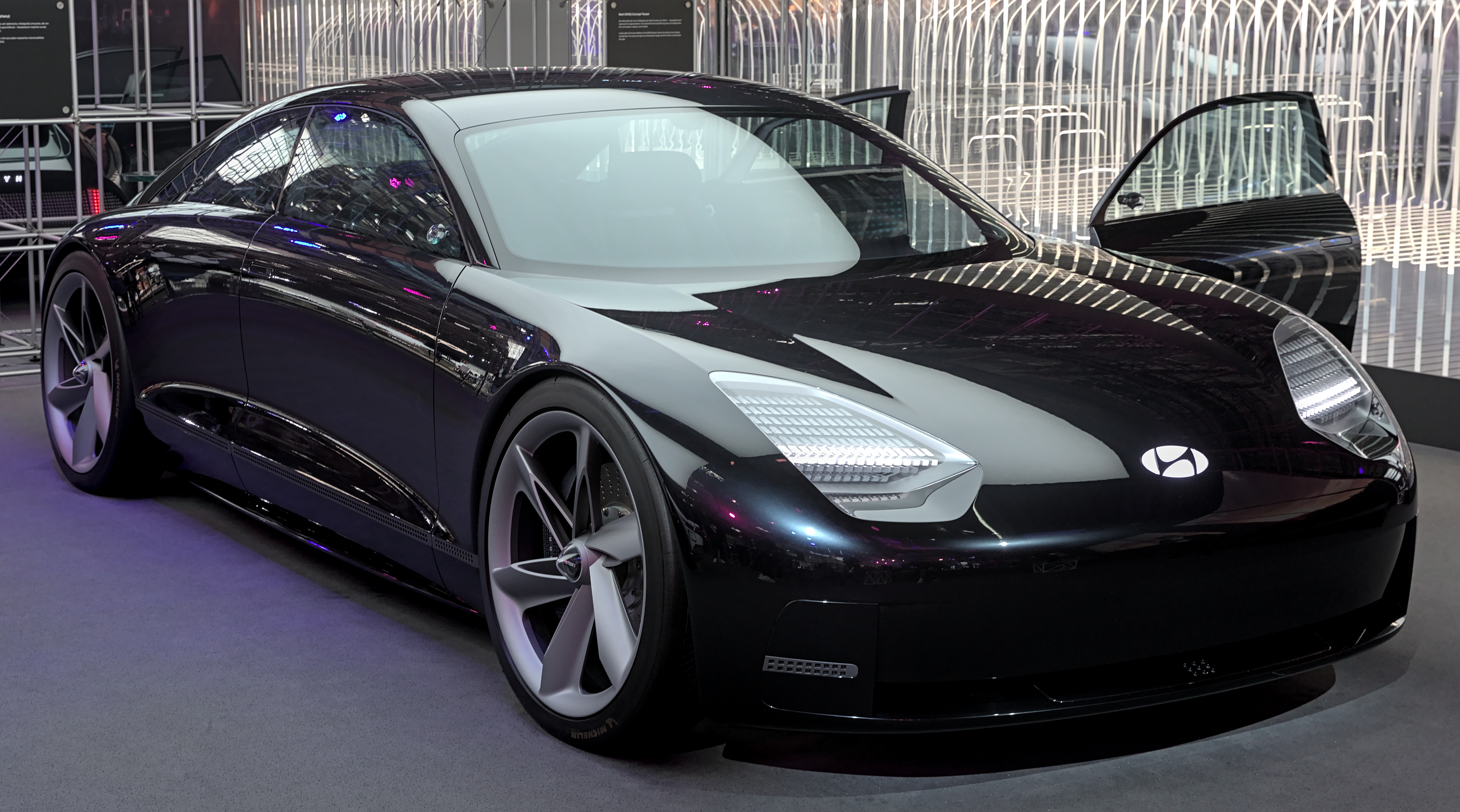
Hyundai Prophecy concept (front)

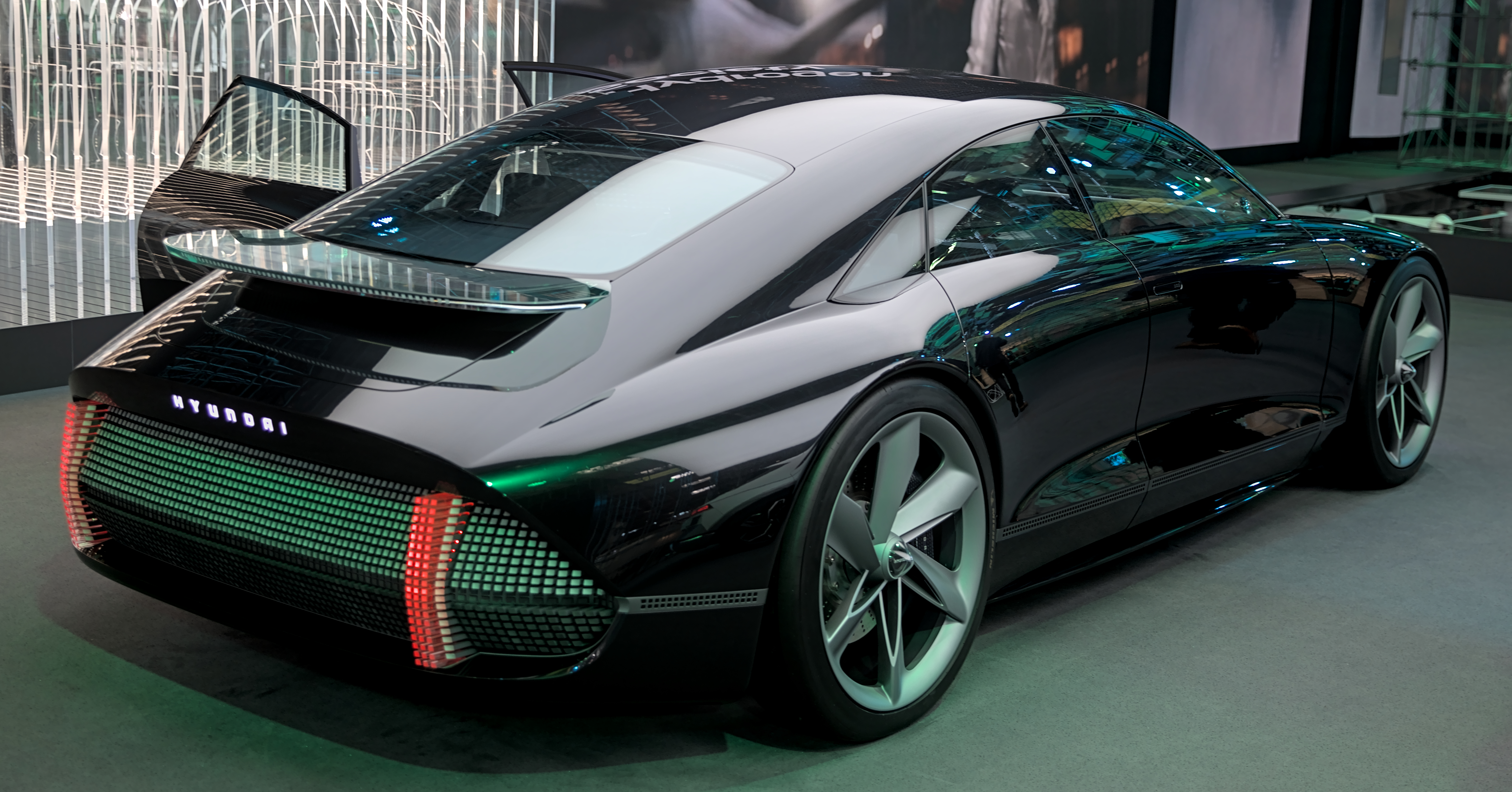
Hyundai Prophecy concept (rear)

=== RN22e ===
The RN22e concept is derived from the Ioniq 6 and carries the Hyundai N motorsport sub-brand; it was revealed in July 2022 during N Day 2022. The RN22e previews an Ioniq 6 N high-performance variant for regular production; it is equipped with an all-wheel drive powertrain featuring upgraded traction motors that have outputs of 160 and 270 kW (218 and 367 PS; 215 and 362 hp) front and rear, respectively, and electronic torque vectoring on the rear differential using a twin-clutch system, branded e-TVTC. Combined output is 430 kW (585 PS; 577 hp) and 740 N⋅m (546 lbf⋅ft), identical to the drivetrain of the Kia EV6 GT. The motors now rotate at up to 20,000 RPM, compared to 15,000 RPM in the regular Ioniq 6, increasing top speed. Power is supplied by a 77.4 kW-hr battery.

Compared to the regular Ioniq 6, the RN22e is 61 mm (2.4 in) longer and 140 mm (5.7 in) wider, rolling on 21-inch wheels. The cooling system has been upgraded to prevent overheating of the battery and motors. It is equipped with an optional "gearshift mode" which simulates engine noises and a paddle-shifted transmission implemented by briefly decreasing motor output, which was called "surprisingly convincing" but slowed the car's overall lap time.

The RN22e is being used to test components that are fitted to the racing variant of the Ioniq 6, with which Hyundai N plan to campaign in the eTouring Car World Cup series starting in 2023. The forthcoming Ioniq 6-based racing car will replace the Veloster N ETCR that was raced in 2021 and 2022. During a hands-on session at the Bilster Berg track, Motor Trend writer Angus MacKenzie noted "the RN22e was setup deliberately to be something of a show-off drift king, to prove an EV can make you smile behind the wheel".

The Hyundai Ioniq 6 N was introduced on 10 July 2025 at the 2025 Goodwood Festival of Speed taking inspiration of the Rn22e concept sharing the same powertrain and horsepower from the Ioniq 5 N.

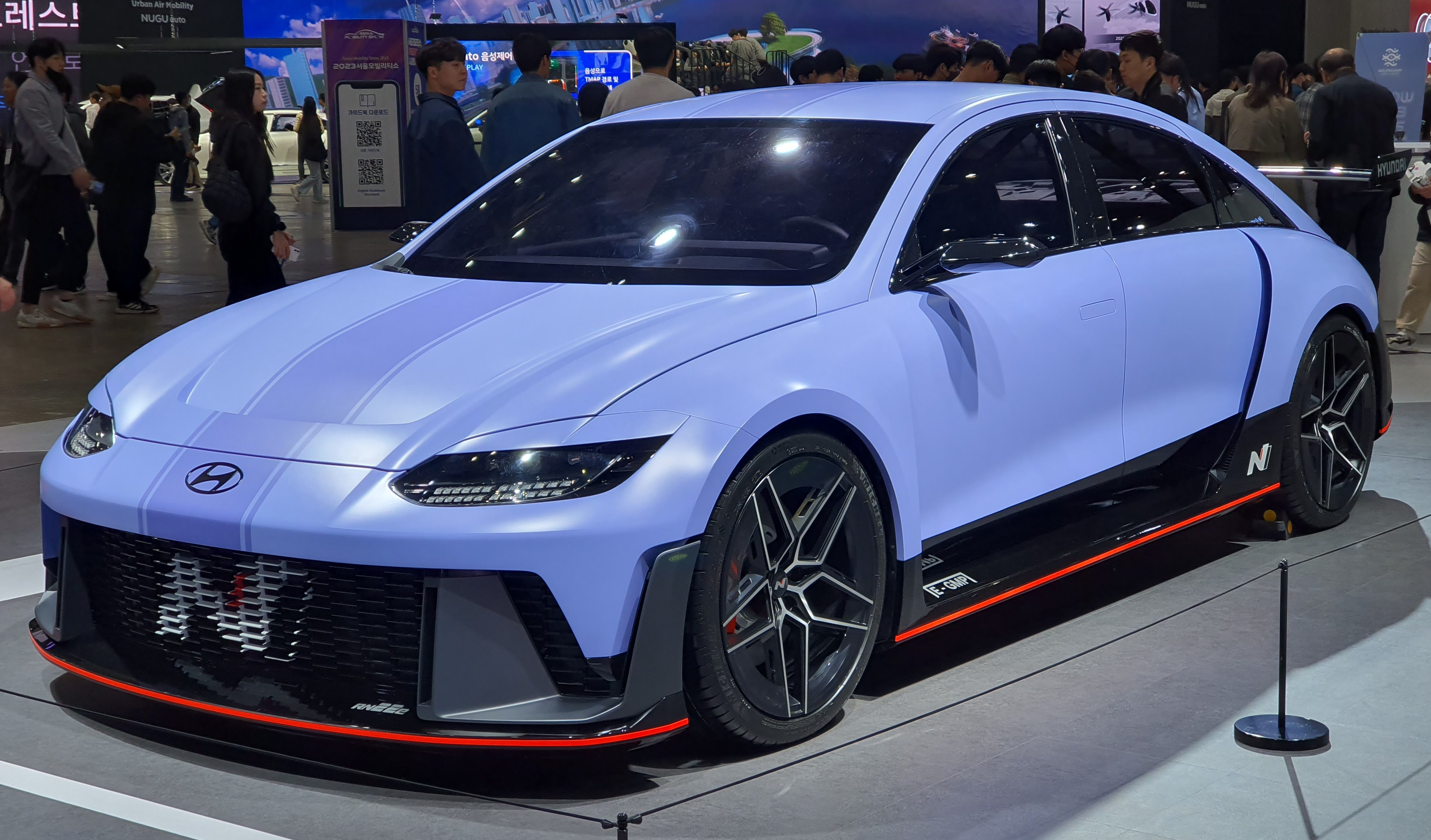
Hyundai RN22e concept (front)

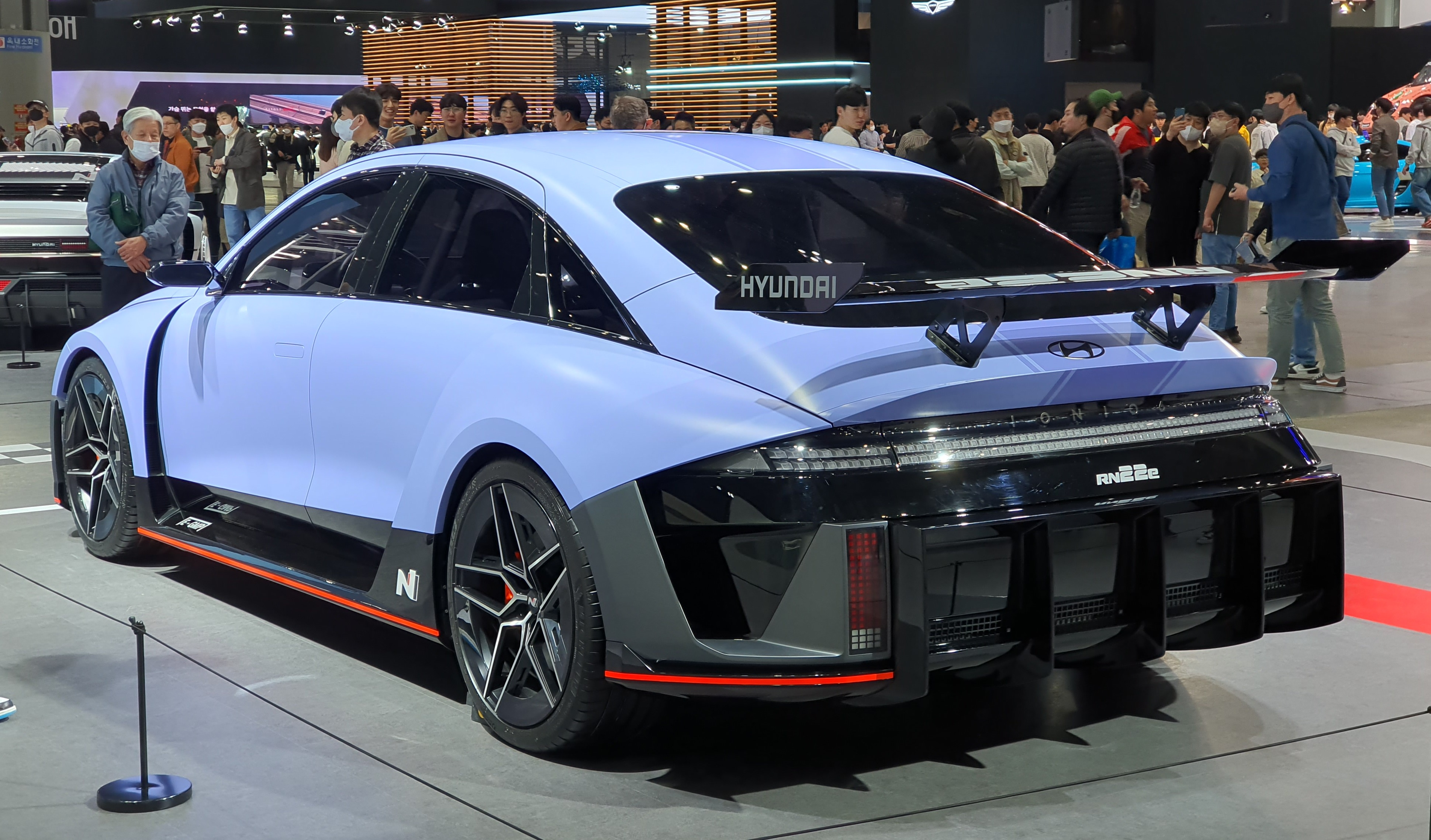
Hyundai RN22e concept (rear)

== 2025 facelift ==
The facelifted Ioniq 6 was revealed alongside the second-generation Nexo at the Seoul Mobility Show 2025 on 3 April 2025. It features a redesigned front and rear fascia with new headlights and taillights under the 'Pure Flow, Refined' design concept, including refined curves, slim DRLs, and an updated interior with a redesigned steering wheel and enlarged climate control display. The N Line variant was also revealed, with bold styling elements such as sculptural bumpers and Parametric Pixel lamps.

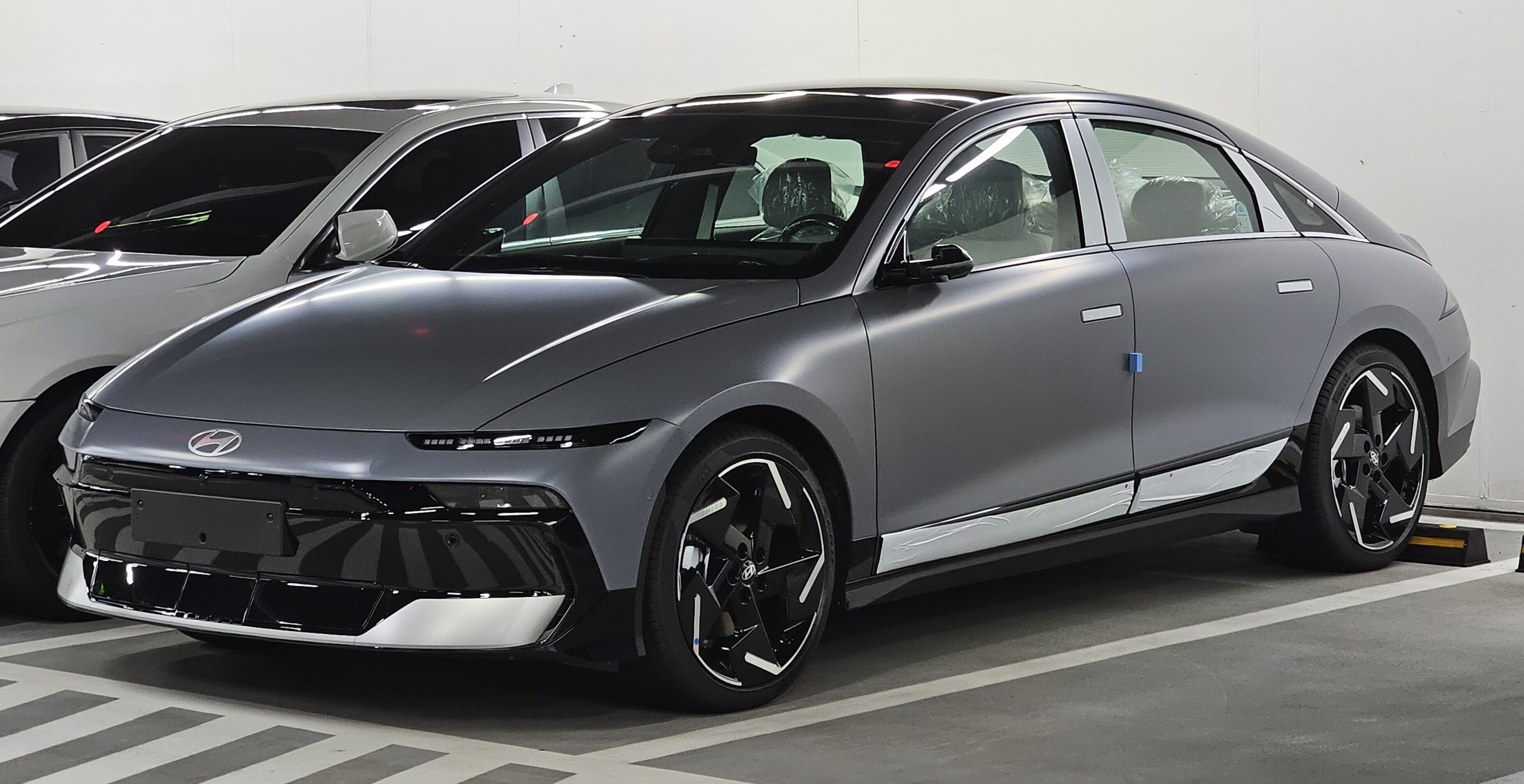
Facelift Ioniq 6 (front)

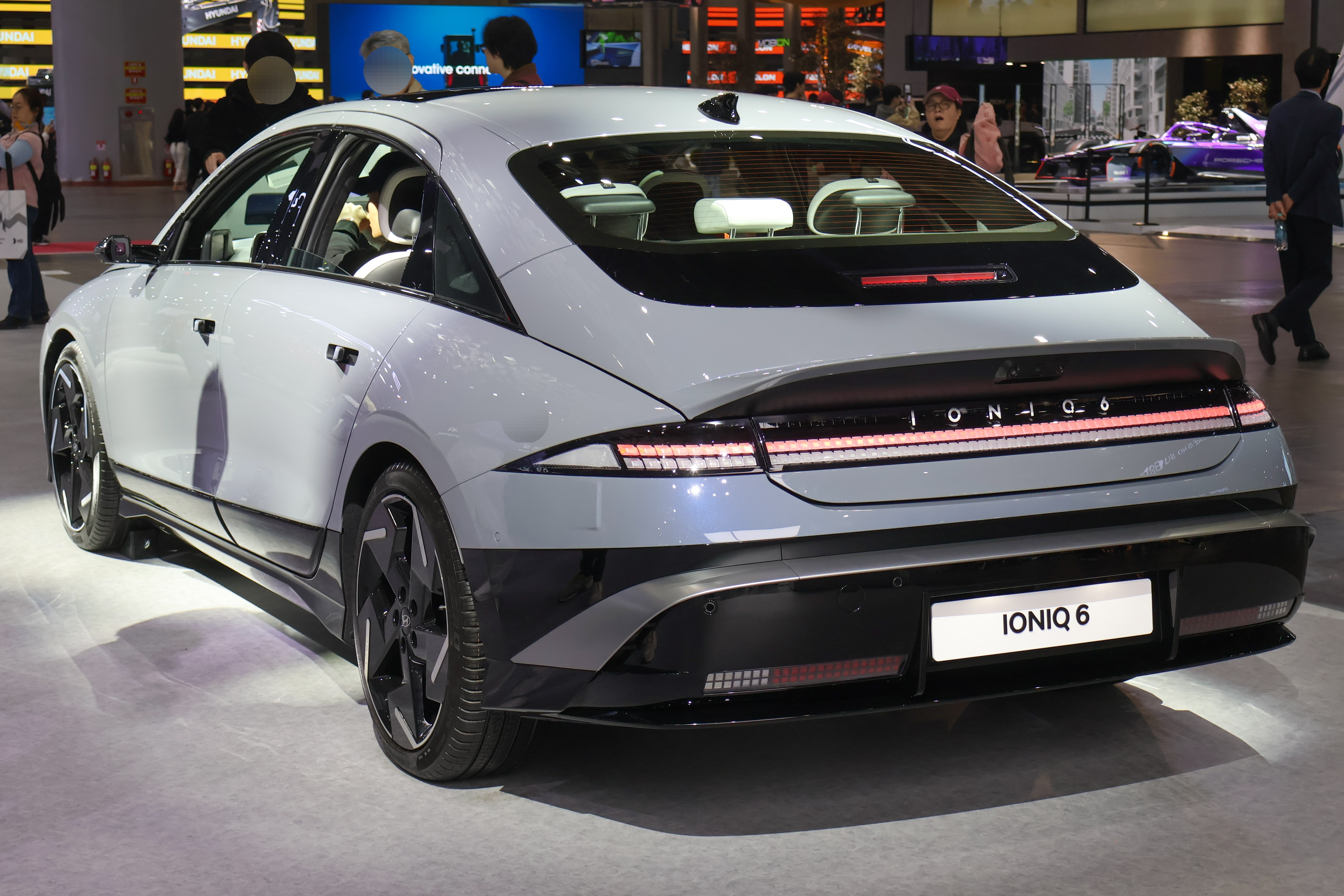
Facelift Ioniq 6 (rear)

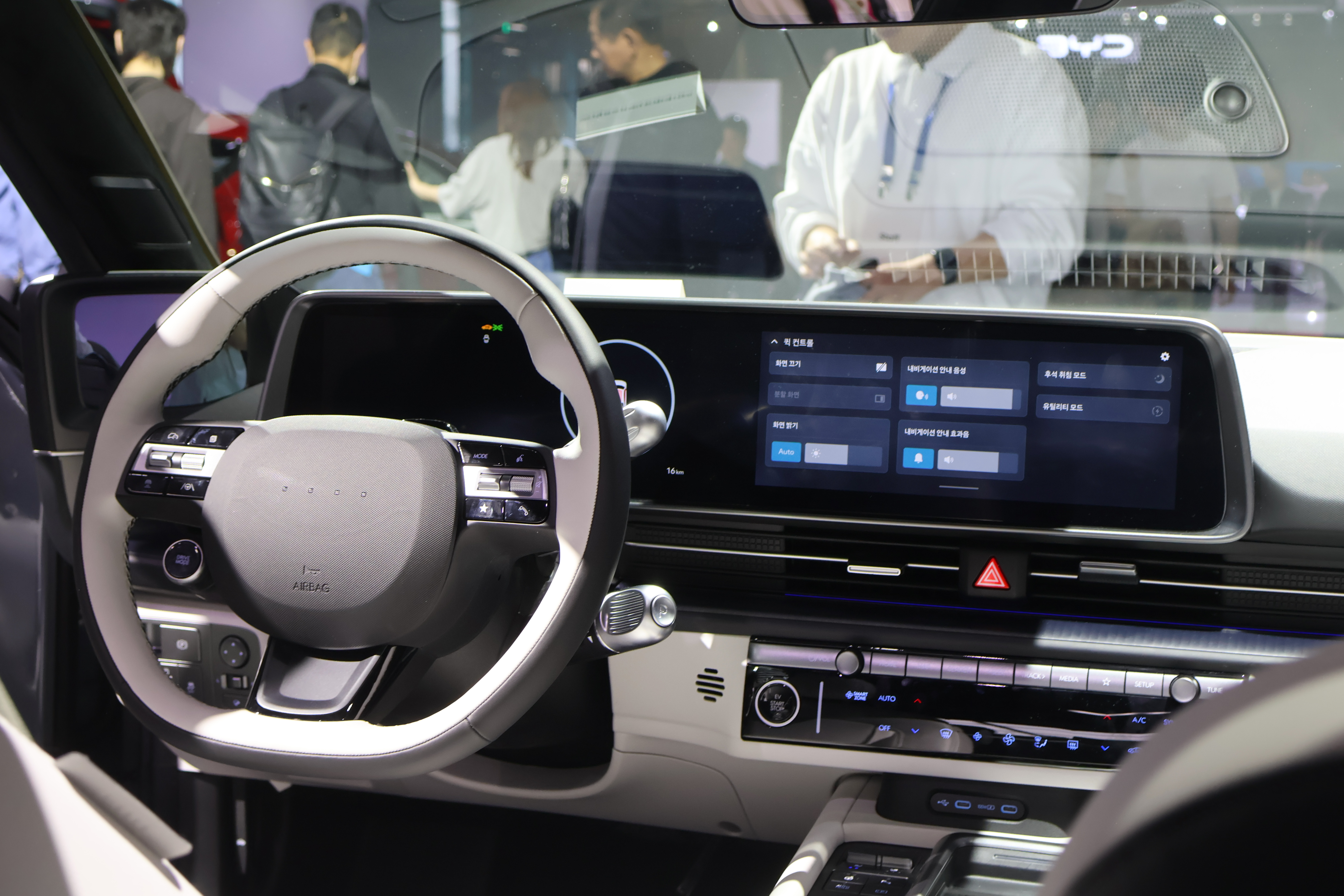
Facelift Ioniq 6 (interior)

=== N-Line ===
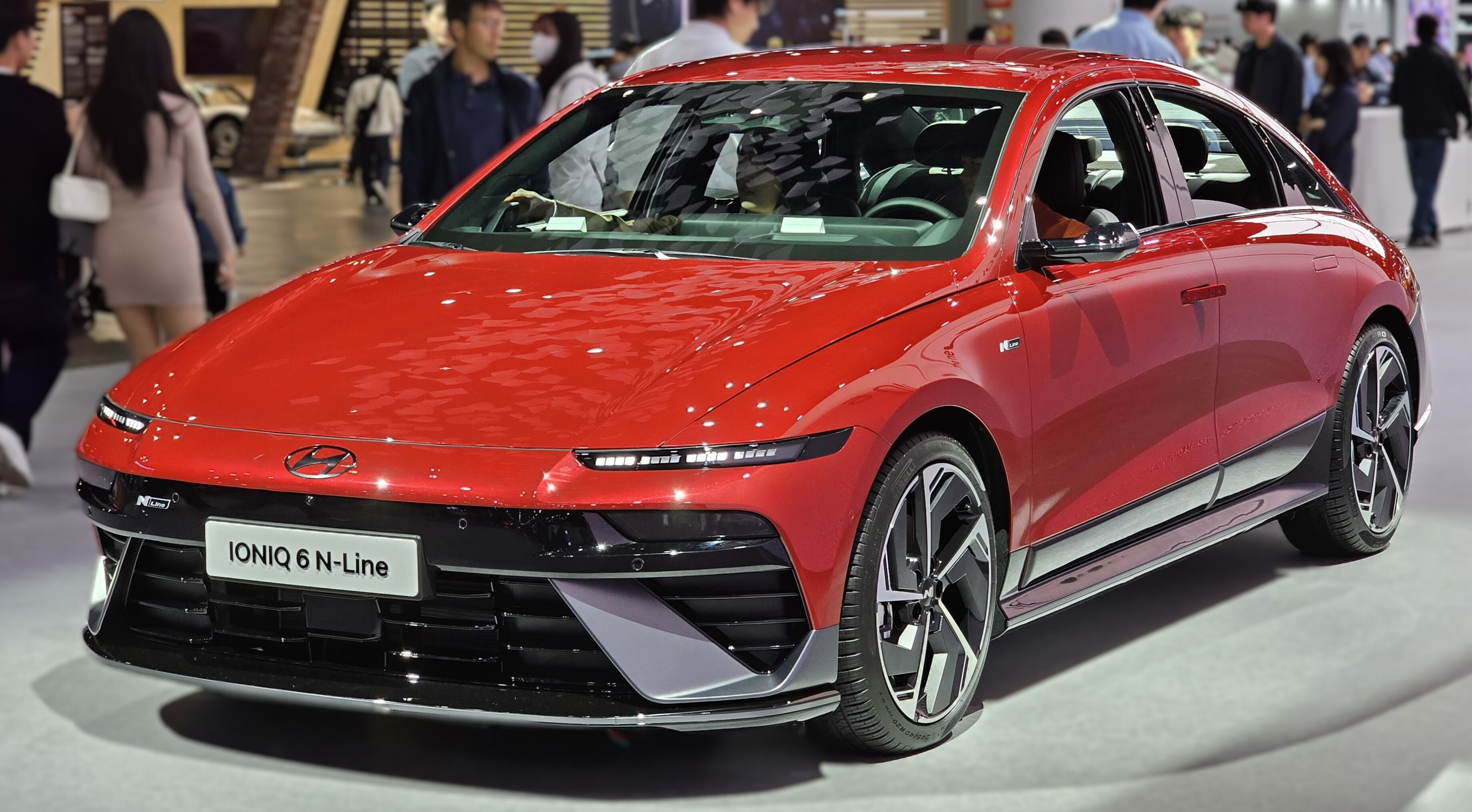
Facelift Ioniq 6 N Line (front)

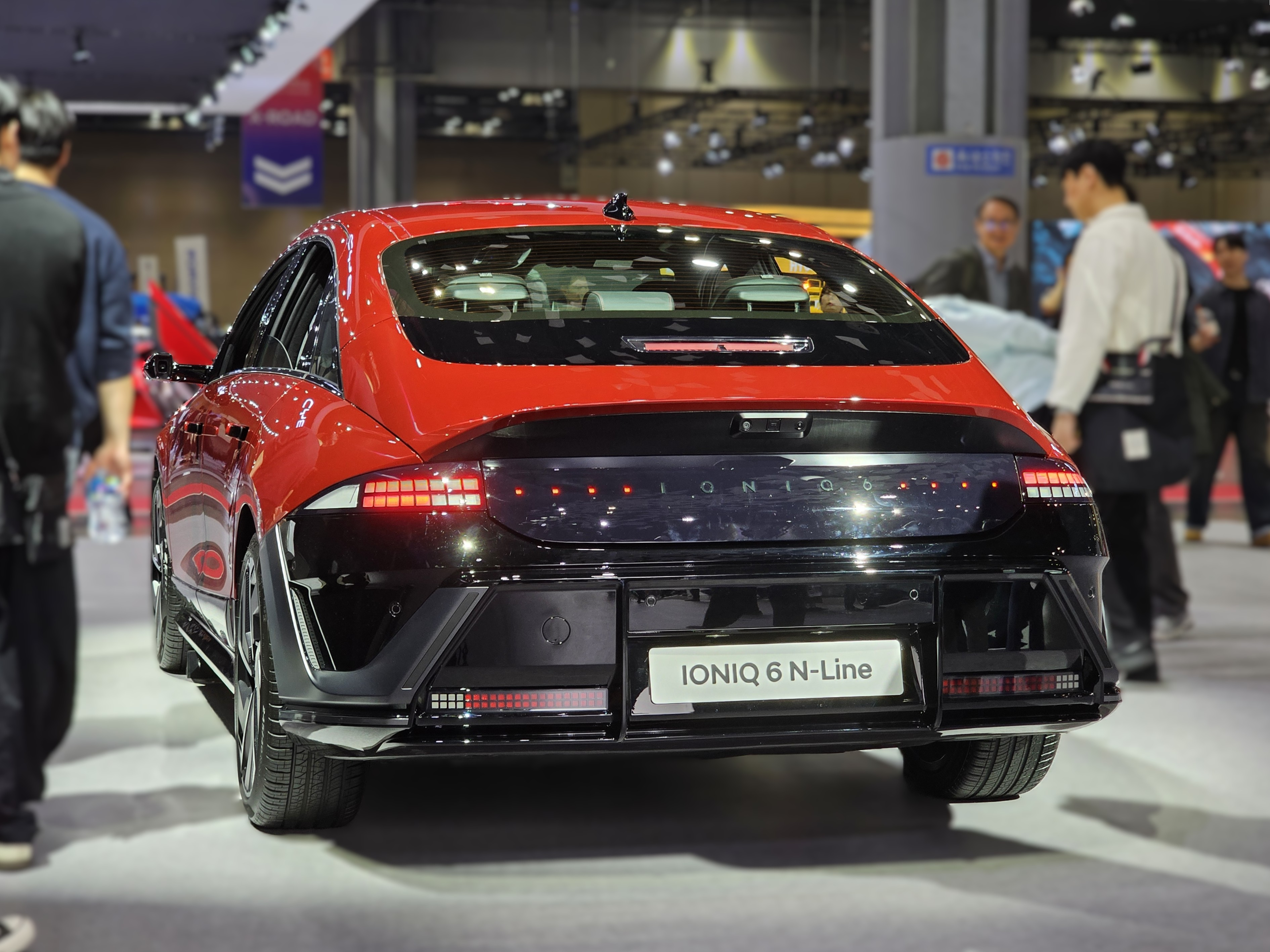
Facelift Ioniq 6 N Line (rear)

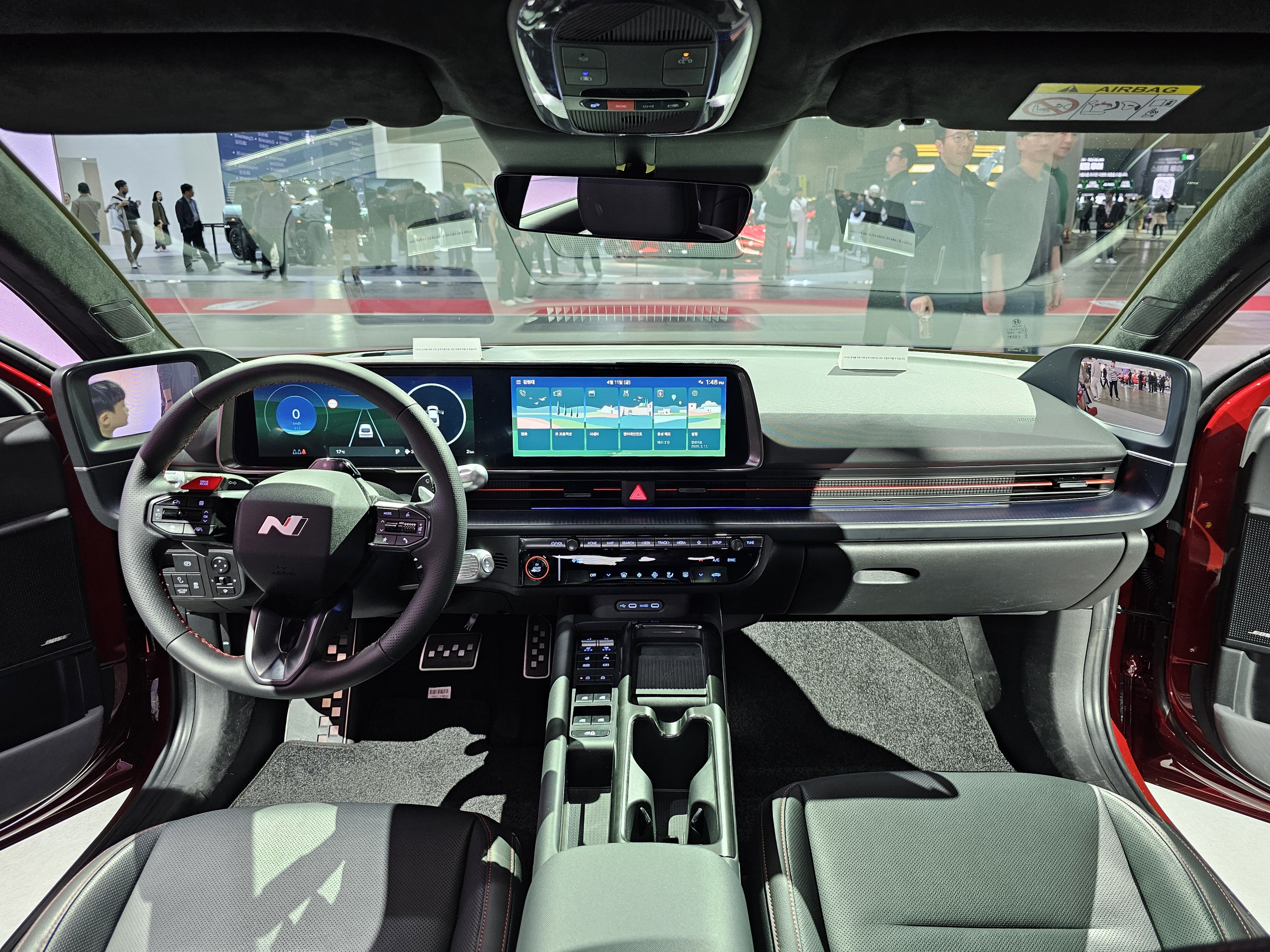
Facelift Ioniq 6 N Line (interior)

== Ioniq 6 N ==
The Ioniq 6 N was introduced on 10 July 2025 during the Goodwood Festival of Speed. It is the top-of-the-line performance variant, marketed under the Hyundai N sub-brand.

The model features a dual-motor all-wheel-drive powertrain producing 478 kW (650 PS; 641 hp) with N Grin Boost, 770 Nm of torque, and an 84.0 kWh battery. It accelerates from 0 to 100 km/h (0 to 62 mph) in 3.2 seconds and has a top speed of 257 km/h (160 mph). Production in Korea first rolled out in 2026.

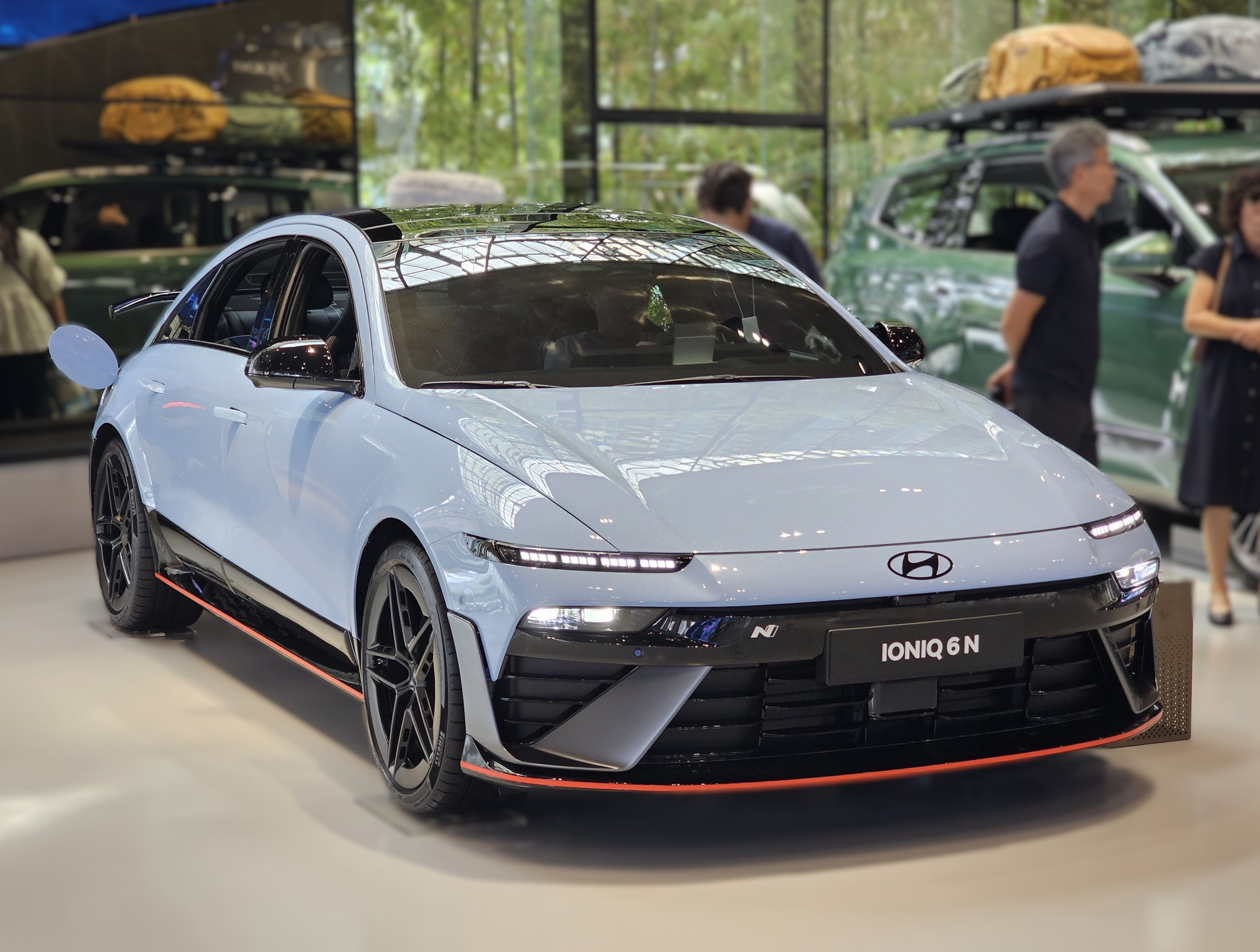
Ioniq 6 N (front)

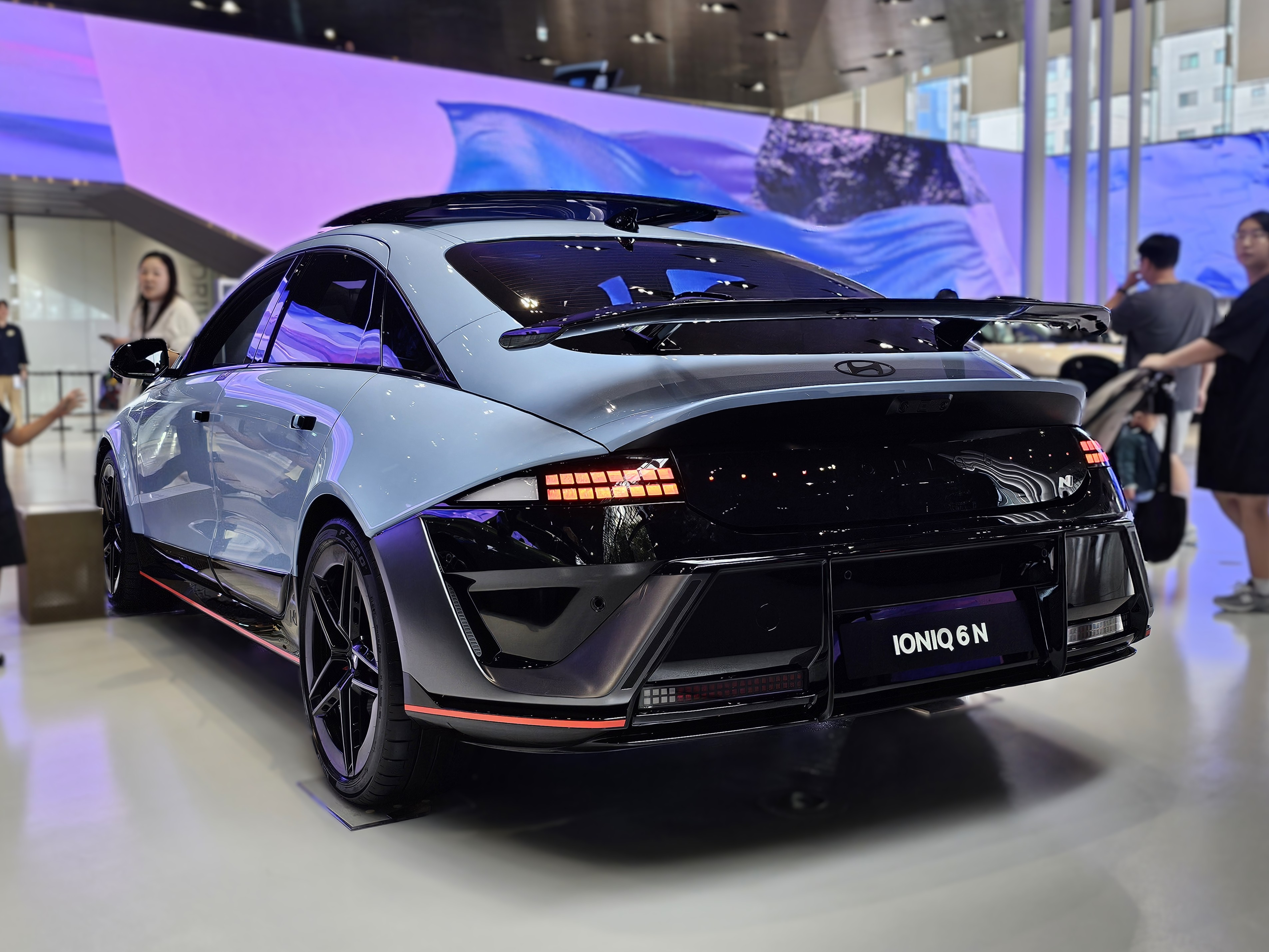
Ioniq 6 N (rear)

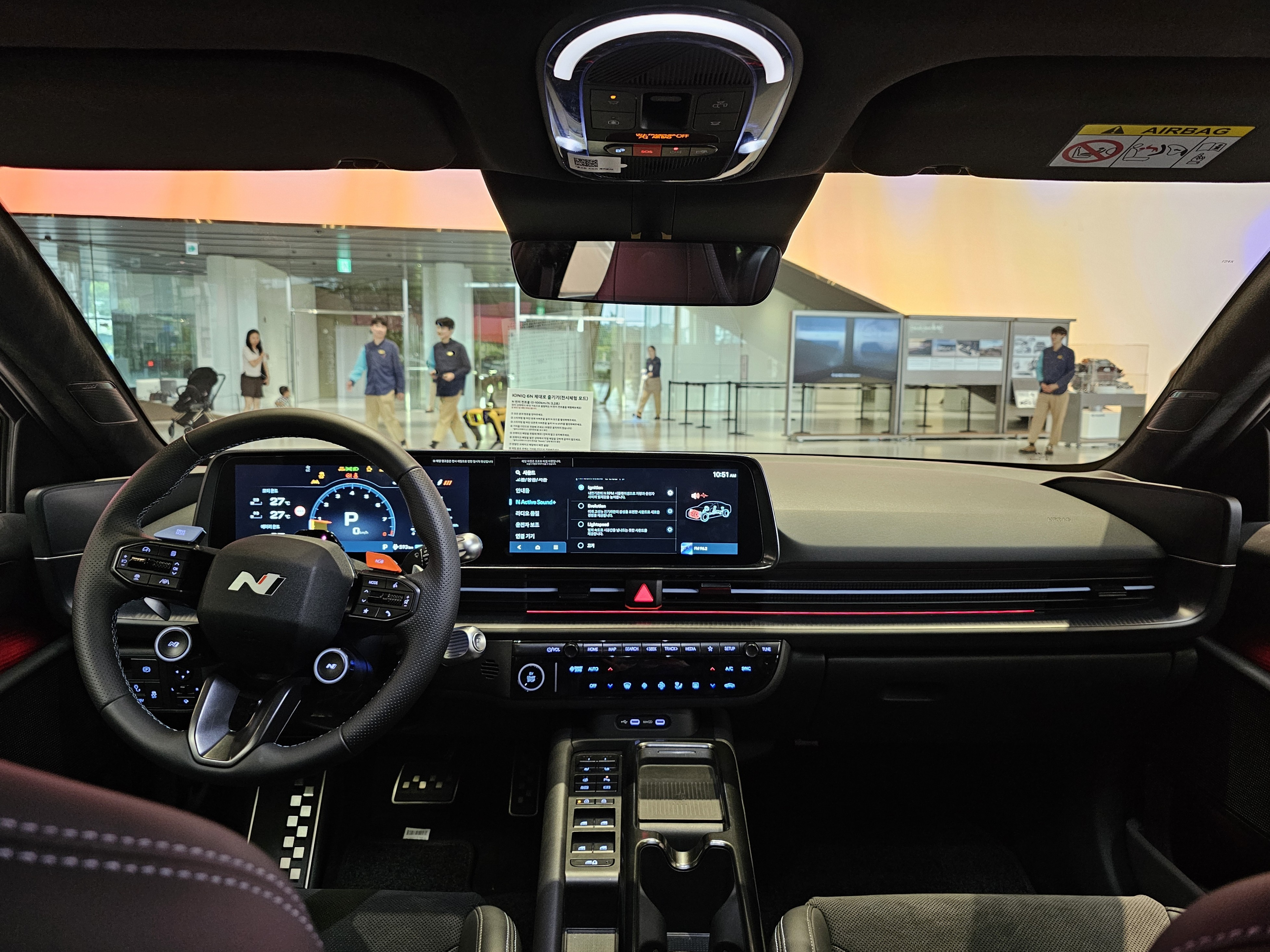
Ioniq 6 N (interior)

== Powertrain ==
Powertrain
Battery	Layout	Power	Torque	0–100 km/h (0–62 mph) (official)	Top speed
53 kWh (Standard Range)	RWD	111 kW (151 PS; 149 hp)	350 N⋅m (258 lb⋅ft)	8.8 s	185 km/h (115 mph)
77.4 kWh (Long Range)	RWD	168 kW (228 PS; 225 hp)	350 N⋅m (258 lb⋅ft)	7.4 s	185 km/h (115 mph)
77.4 kWh (Long Range)	AWD	239 kW (325 PS; 321 hp) (Note: Combined output from front and rear motors)	605 N⋅m (446 lb⋅ft)	5.1 s	185 km/h (115 mph)

Notes

Estimated range is 614 km (382 mi) for the RWD version with the larger (Long Range, 77.4 kWh) battery, using the WLTP cycle. Under Korean test standards, the long-range RWD version with 18-inch wheels was expected to have a range of 524 km (326 mi). For models sold in the United States, the EPA ratings are 361 mi (581 km) for the Long Range RWD and 316 mi (509 km) for the Long Range AWD models with 18-inch wheels; with the larger 20-inch wheels, range drops to 305 and 270 mi (491 and 435 km) for the RWD and AWD versions, respectively.

The standard range version with the smaller 53 kWh battery and 18-inch wheels is expected to have a consumption of less than 14 kWh/100 km (150 mpg‑e), about equal to the shorter range Hyundai Ioniq Electric. The Standard Model was originally not planned to be marketed in the United States but ended up being marketed.

Using an 800 V DC charger supplying 350 kW, the vehicle's battery can be charged from 10% to 80% in 18 minutes. In the United States, new Ioniq 6 vehicles receive two years of unlimited 30-minute free charging sessions at DC fast chargers owned by Electrify America.

== Markets ==
=== Europe ===
In November 2022, a First Edition model, limited to 2,500 units, was available in France, Germany, the Netherlands, Norway, and the United Kingdom. All allocations for the model were sold out in less than 24 hours after pre-orders were opened. The First Edition model uses the Long Range AWD dual-motor powertrain; it features exclusive exterior and interior design elements inspired by the Prophecy concept car. Sales of the regular Ioniq 6 line-up commenced in Europe during the first quarter of 2023.

=== North America ===
The Ioniq 6 was released in the North American market in February 2023. In the U.S., it comes in SE, SEL and Limited trim levels. In Canada, it comes in a sole Preferred trim; it is available with the Ultimate package for the AWD dual-motor model. It is available with either Standard Range (only for US) and Long Range powertrains.

In the 1st quarter of 2026, with the facelifted model, in the U.S. market, the Ioniq 6 N was set to be the only version available.

In March of the same year, the standard Ioniq 6 was discontinued in the U.S. market after the 2025 model year due to low sales and import U.S tariffs. However, the N trim would still be sold in limited numbers. In Canada, the facelifted non-N Ioniq 6 is set to go on sale as a 2027 model after taking a hiatus for the 2026 model year.

=== Oceania ===
==== Australia ====
The Ioniq 6 was launched in Australia on 8 February 2023, in three trim levels: Dynamiq, Techniq and Epiq. All variants use the Long Range powertrain. In November 2023, the base trim was added, the digital side mirrors became an option (downgraded to standard door mirrors) on the Epiq in response to customer feedback and new powertrain options for the Dynamiq and Techniq trims.

The Ioniq 6 N was launched in Australia on 4 May 2026, as the second model from the Hyundai N performance sub-brand to be introduced in the Australian market.

==== New Zealand ====
The Ioniq 6 was launched in New Zealand on 28 February 2023, in three trim levels: Entry, Elite and Limited. It is available with Standard Range and Long Range powertrains, with an AWD dual-motor setup standard on the Limited.

=== Asia ===
==== Indonesia ====
The Ioniq 6 was launched in Indonesia on 14 August 2023 during the fourth day of the 30th Gaikindo Indonesia International Auto Show. Imported from South Korea, The model is offered in one variant with one powertrain option: Signature with the Long Range (77.4 kWh) battery pack with all-wheel drive.

==== Malaysia ====
The Ioniq 6 was launched in Malaysia on 21 July 2023 in a sole Max trim using the Long Range powertrain, with the option between RWD single-motor and AWD dual-motor layouts. The Lite and trims were added in September 2023, both trims use the Standard Range powertrain with a RWD single-motor layout.

The Ioniq 6 N was launched in Malaysia on 11 June 2026, as part of the introduction of the Hyundai N performance sub-brand to the Malaysian market.

==== Philippines ====
The Ioniq 6 made its ASEAN premiere in the Philippines at the 18th Manila International Auto Show before its launch on 26 June 2023. It is offered in a sole GLS 2WD Long Range variant.

==== Singapore ====
The Ioniq 6 was launched in Singapore on 19 July 2024, in three trim levels: Exclusive, Prestige and Inspiration. It is available in either Standard Range or Long Range powertrains, with an AWD dual-motor setup standard on the Inspiration. It is the third Hyundai vehicle to be locally assembled at the Hyundai Motor Group Innovation Centre facility in Jurong, after the regular Ioniq 5 and Ioniq 5 Robotaxi.

==== Taiwan ====
The Ioniq 6 was launched in Taiwan on 7 March 2023, with three variants: EV400 (53 kWh), EV600 (77.4 kWh), and EV600 Performance (77.4 kWh AWD). The entry-level EV400 variant was discontinued in January 2024 and was later reintroduced in February 2024, with adjustments to equipment options and a few interior features becoming optional extras.

==== Thailand ====
The Ioniq 6 was launched in Thailand on 26 March 2024 in a sole Long Range Exclusive RWD variant.

== Awards ==
- World Car of The Year 2023
- World Car Design of The Year 2023
- World Electric Vehicle of The Year 2023
- Scottish Car of the Year 2023
- Irish Car of the Year 2024

== Safety ==
=== IIHS ===
The 2023 Ioniq 6 was awarded "Top Safety Pick+" by the IIHS.

IIHS scores (2023)
Small overlap front (driver)	Good
Small overlap front (passenger)	Good
Moderate overlap front (original test)	Good
Moderate overlap front (updated test)	Good
Side (updated test)	Good
Headlights (varies by trim/option)	Acceptable
Front crash prevention: vehicle-to-pedestrian (Day)	Superior
Front crash prevention: vehicle-to-pedestrian (Night)	Superior
Seatbelt reminders	Good
Child seat anchors (LATCH) ease of use	Acceptable

=== Euro NCAP ===
Euro NCAP test results Hyundai Ioniq 6 (LHD) (2022)
Test	Points	%
Overall:	5 /5 stars	
Adult occupant:	37.0	97%
Child occupant:	43.0	87%
Pedestrian:	36.0	66%
Safety assist:	14.4	90%

=== ANCAP ===
ANCAP test results Hyundai IONIQ 6 (2021, aligned with Euro NCAP)
Test	Points	%
Overall:	5 /5 stars	
Adult occupant:	36.96	97%
Child occupant:	41.43	88%
Pedestrian:	36.02	66%
Safety assist:	14.49	90%

== Sales ==
Year	South Korea	United States	Europe	Turkey	Canada	Global sales
2022	11,289	0	6		0	14,821
2023	9,284	12,999	10,819		2,873	54,824
2024	4,957	12,264	6,631	2,014	2,671	27,971
2025		10,478			2,235	

== See also ==
- Ioniq
- List of Hyundai vehicles
