= Hyundai Prophecy =

Concept car

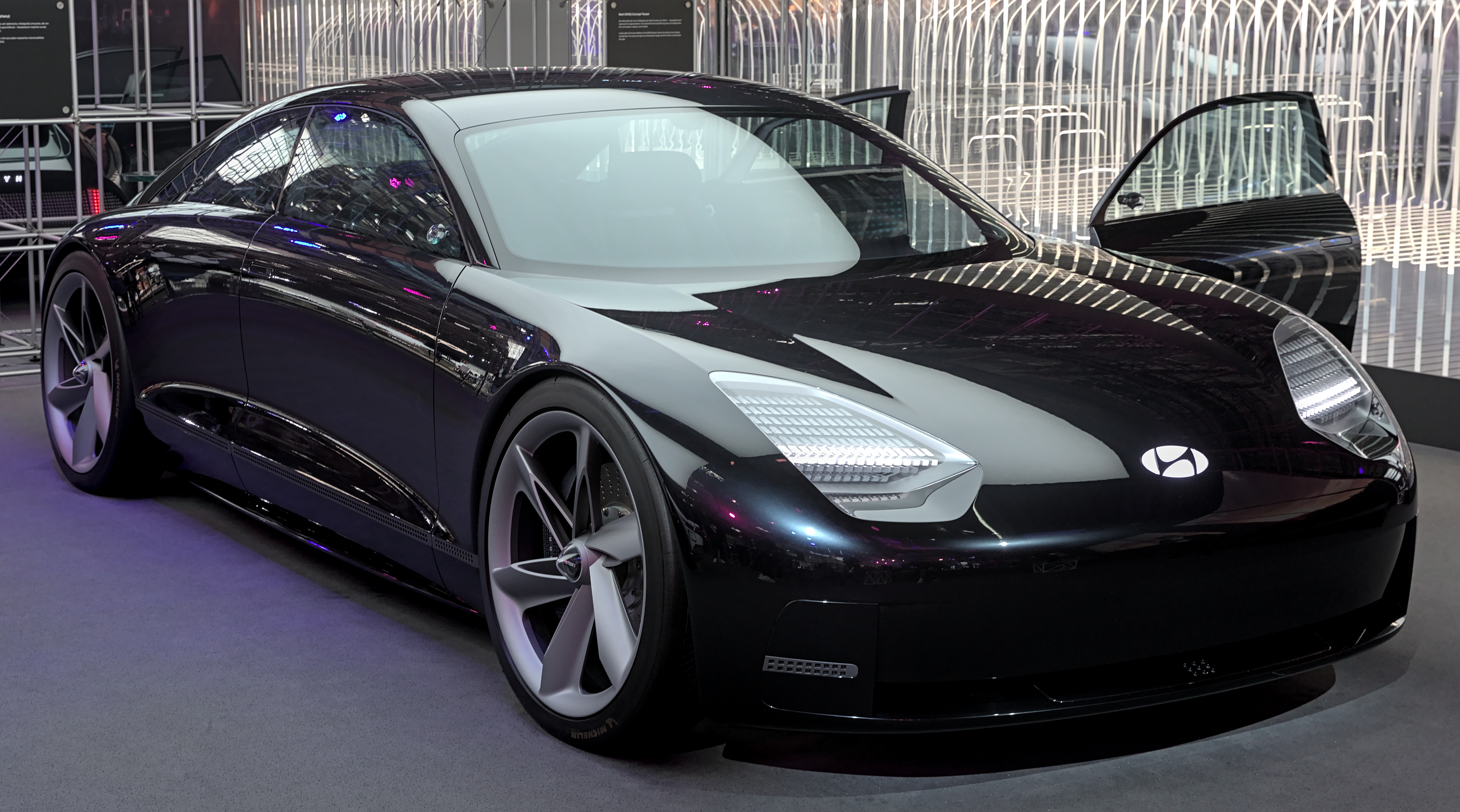

Overview
- Manufacturer: Hyundai Motor Company
- Production: 2020 (concept) (2022 as Ioniq 6)
- Designer: SangYup Lee

Body and chassis
- Class: Concept car
- Body style: 4-door sedan
- Doors: Conventional (front); Suicide (rear)

The Hyundai Prophecy is a concept electric car produced by the South Korean manufacturer Hyundai presented in March 2020, and announced in a family sedan range in 2021 replacing the Hyundai Ioniq. The Hyundai Ioniq 6 went into production a year after the Hyundai Ioniq 5 with the mission to form part of the company's 23 electric vehicles (EV) portfolio occurred in 2025.

== Presentation ==
The Hyundai Prophecy concept car was to be presented at the Geneva Motor Show in 2020 but it was canceled due to the COVID-19 pandemic in Switzerland. It was presented on the web on 3 March 2020. The production version is called the Ioniq 6, under Hyundai's Ioniq sub brand, and has entered the market in 2022.

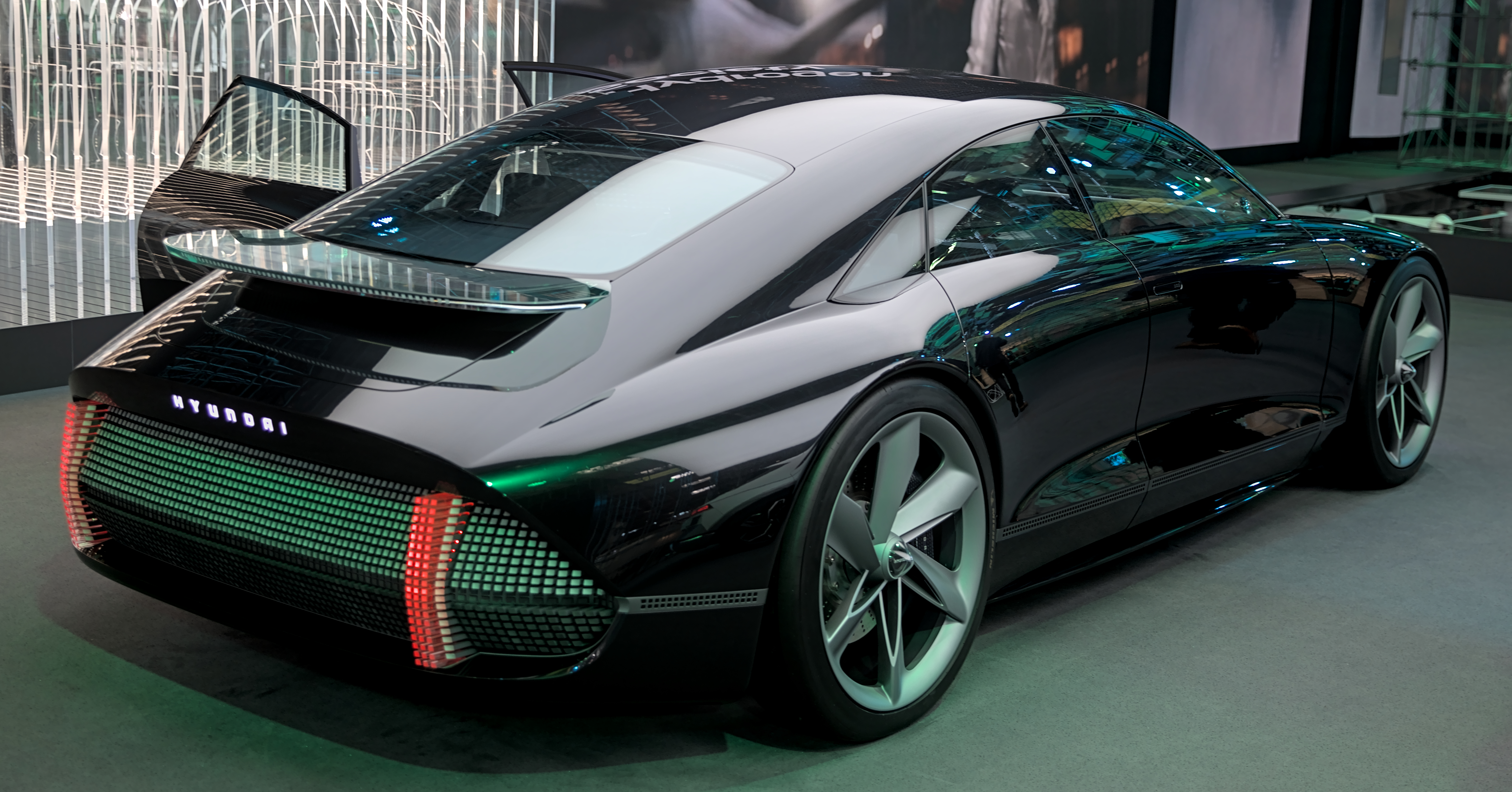
Rear view

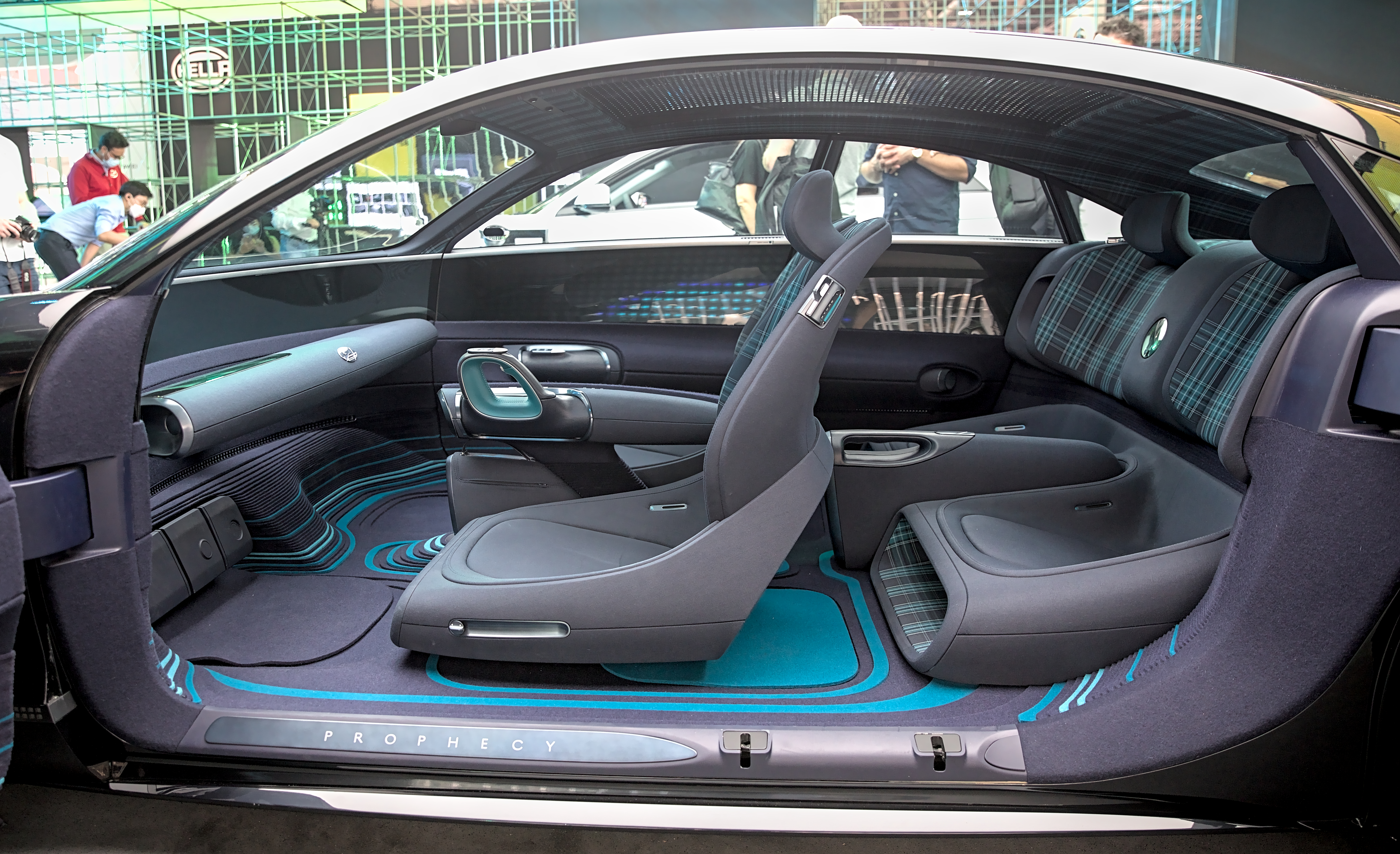
Interior

== Technical characteristics ==
The Prophecy is based on a new modular technical platform called "e-GMP" dedicated to the brand's future electric vehicles. It is equipped with rear doors with antagonistic openings. Inside, the concept has an air purifier and there is no steering wheel, this is replaced by two joysticks arranged on each side of the driver.
