= Adam Richards =

New Zealand racing driver

- Nationality: New Zealand

D1NZ, Drift Revolution, NZ Drift Series career
- Debut season: 2003
- Current team: WSR
- Best finish: 1st in 2005

Championship titles
- 2005: D1NZ 'Drift King'

Adam Richards is a drifting driver from New Plymouth, New Zealand. He has been drifting competitively since 2003 and was crowned the 2005 D1NZ champion driving a modified Nissan Cefiro. He has competed in the D1 World All Stars Drift Championship in 2006 and 2007.

== Cars ==
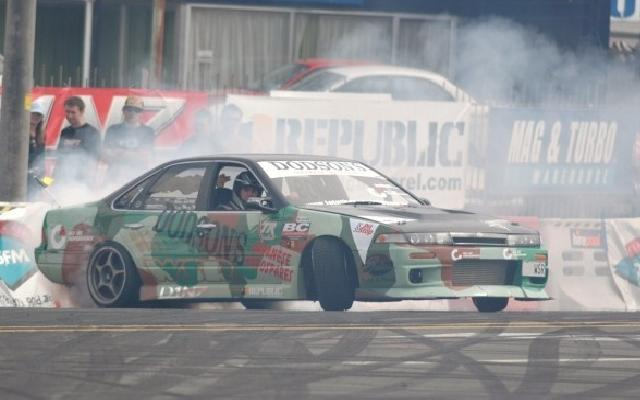
Adam drifting at D1NZ rd 5 2005

=== Nissan Cefiro A31 ===
Richards started in the D1NZ series using a modified Nissan Cefiro with camouflage coloured paint by Steven Sole Customs. Not Stickers. He swapped the standard engine with a RB26DET from a Nissan Skyline GT-R to increase the power output. This helped him to get a spot on the podium in four out of the six rounds of 2005. Richards stopped using this car competitively after the first round of D1NZ 2006, making way for a sponsored Nissan Silvia.

The Cefiro made a return in round 3 of Drift Revolution 2007, sporting a new exterior design. After a few competitions in New Zealand, the car was shipped to America to compete in the D1 All stars. He is currently competing in the European Drift Championship with the car.

=== Nissan Silvia S15 (HKS) ===
After winning the 2005 championship, Richards approached with new sponsors HKS and Dodson's, built a new car for the upcoming 2006 season. Starting from a ground up rebuild, primarily with HKS parts, the total build cost was roughly $150,000 (NZ). He competed with this car throughout 2006 and 2007, although struggled, finishing eighth in the 2006 season.
