= D1NZ =

Production car drifting series

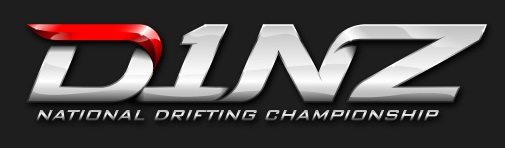
- New Zealand Drifting Championship
- Category: Drifting
- Country: New Zealand
- Inaugural season: 2003
- Drivers: Adam Davies • Andrew Redward • Ben Jenkins • Bex Bennett • Bejamin Wilkinson • Bruce Tannock • Carl Thompson • Cole Armstrong • Daniel Woolhouse • Darren Kelly • Dave Steedman • Shane Van Gisbergen • Daynom Templeman • Drew Donovan • Gagan Kang • Brad Smith • Jaron Olivecrona • Jase Brown • Jerry Zhu • Jesse Greenslade • Jodie Donovan • Joel Paterson • Jordy Cole • Keisuke Nagashima • Liam Burke • Shane Allen • Stuart Baker • Troy Jenkins • Vincent Langhorn
- Teams: Driftcorp • WSR • Team DSR • BEX Drift • FDC Motorsport • DK Motorsport • Team DMNZ • Whittaker Motorsport • Rattla Motorsport • Olivecrona Drift Motorsport • Central Drift Team • Team Jenkins Motorsport • DDT Racing • BSR • 07 Drift • JC Drift • Mag & Turbo Motorsport • Euphoric Motorsport • Wilkinson Motorsport • Armstrong Drift • LBP Drift • Andrew Redward Racing • 86Fighters •
- Constructors: Nissan • Toyota • Mazda • Holden • Ford • BMW
- Engine suppliers: Toyota JZ Series, Nissan RB Series, Nissan VQ, Chevrolet LS, Ford Performance, Roush-Yates, Hartley Engines,
- Drivers' champion: Fanga Dan Woolhouse
- Makes' champion: Ford
- Teams' champion: FDC
- Official website: d1nz.com

D1NZ is a production car drifting series in New Zealand, a sanctioned championship under Motorsport New Zealand, the official FIA appointed governing body of motor-racing in New Zealand. It began early in 2003 as a small competition consisting of several drifting teams from all over the country in order to organise and regulate Drifting events in the country. Since then it has continued to grow larger and more professional, now involving professional teams and internationally ranked drivers.

The series consists of two national title competitions, the D1NZ Pro Championship and the D1NZ Pro-Sport Series. New competitors generally need to prove themselves in the Pro-Sport Series before progressing into the pro class, unless competing with an equivalent international licence. Organizers aim to promote and educate Drifting in New Zealand, with a regulated safe environment. Despite similar moniker, the series is not related to the Japanese D1 Grand Prix series. It has been recognised as the longest running drifting series in the world.

The Category has traditionally formed a five round national competition with a mixture of tight & technical courses and faster, full throttle race circuits. In 2019 the Pro-Championship tour includes Wellington's Max Motors Speedway, Trustpower Baypark in Tauranga, Manfeild Circuit Chris Amon, Hampton Downs Motorsport Park and Pukekohe Park Raceway

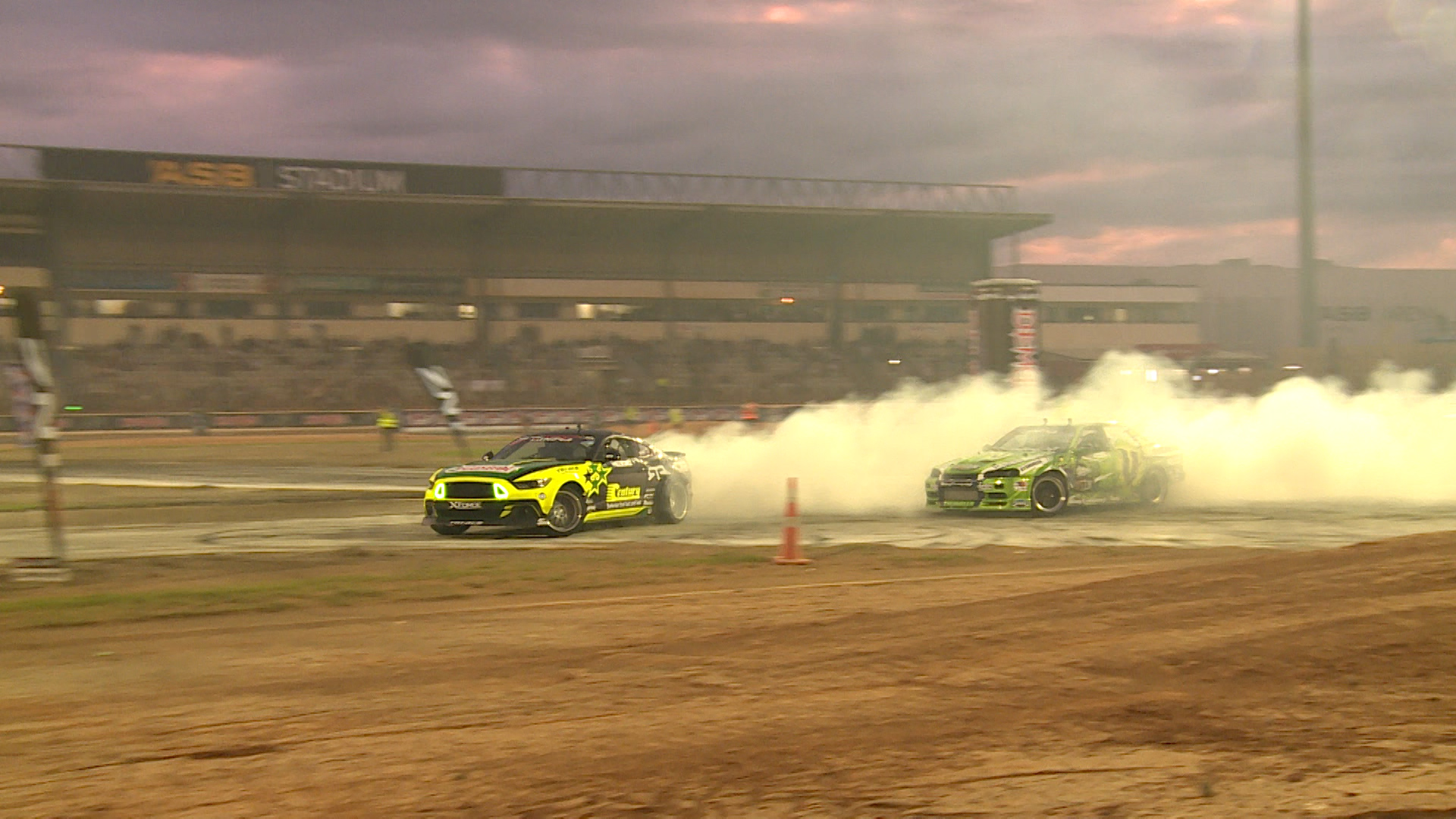
Daniel 'Fanga Dan' Woolhouse competing against Cole Armstrong during an event at ASB Baypark Stadium in Tauranga

== Competition format ==
Drivers compete in a Qualifying session for each event, their qualifying position determines their grid position in a Top-32 or Top-24 seeded battle tree. Each driver receives 2 qualifying passes in a shootout style format, with a marble draw used for the grid order. Each competitor is scored by three judging officials for each pass.

A maximum of 100 points will be allocated by the Judges to a competitor for each Pass in accordance with the following criteria:

- Line: 35/100
- Angle: 35/100
- Style: 30/100

The highest Qualifier shall be the driver with the highest aggregate score from all judges. The judging criteria consist of a racing line set out by the judges, marked by clipping points or clipping areas.

Round Points For Qualifying:
| Qualifying Position | Championship Points |
|---|---|
| 1 | 7 |
| 2 | 6 |
| 3 | 5 |
| 4 | 4 |
| 5-8 | 4 |
| 9-16 | 3 |
| 17-32 | 2 |

The main competition of each D1NZ event sees the drivers compete through their seeded battle tree in an elimination battle. Competitors are seeded with the top ranked driver drawn against the lowest ranked driver, the second highest ranked driver drawn against the second lowest ranked driver and so on. The number of seeds is based on the size of the field. Each battle consists of two passes, a lead and a chase run for each driver. The winner of each elimination battle is the driver judged successful from both passes, or any re-run battle and advances to the next bracket (Top32, Top16, Top 8, Top 4 etc) The remainder are eliminated from competition. The Top 4 (semi-finals) battle winners shall contest for a place in the round final battle, with the unsuccessful drivers contesting for third and fourth.

The objective for each driver is to set or better their performance in qualifying during their lead run. The driver in the chase position must also set or better their qualifying performance, but use the leading car as a mobile clipping point around the course, aiming to position their car as close as possible to the leading vehicle while fulfilling the competition criteria set out by the judges.

Overall Round Points Allocation:
| Overall Position | Championship Points |
|---|---|
| 1 | 100 |
| 2 | 80 |
| 3 | 68 |
| 4 | 60 |
| 5-8 | 48 |
| 9-16 | 32 |
| 17-32 | 16 |
| DNQ | 1 |
| DNE | 0 |

== List of Pro-Series Champions ==
| Year | Driver | Team | Vehicle |
|---|---|---|---|
| 2003 | (New Zealand) Jairus Wharerau | Driftcorp | Nissan Cefiro A31 |
| 2004 | (New Zealand) Justin Rood | Driftcorp | Nissan Cefiro A31 |
| 2005 | (New Zealand) Adam Richards | WSR | Nissan Cefiro A31 |
| 2006 | (New Zealand) Daniel Woolhouse | Dunlop Direzza (Driftcorp) | Nissan Silvia S15 |
| 2007 | (New Zealand) Carl Ruiterman | E&H Motors | Nissan Silvia S14 |
| 2008 | (New Zealand) Gaz Whiter | Toyo Tyres (Driftcorp) | Nissan Silvia S14 |
| 2009–10 | (New Zealand) Gaz Whiter | Big Ben Pies (Driftcorp) | Nissan Silvia S14 |
| 2010–11 | (New Zealand) Gaz Whiter | Big Ben Pies (Driftcorp) | Nissan Silvia S14 |
| 2011–12 | (New Zealand) Curt Whittaker | Whittaker Motorsport | Nissan Skyline R34 |
| 2012–13 | (New Zealand) Daniel Woolhouse | Castrol Edge (Driftcorp) | Holden Commodore VE |
| 2013–14 | (New Zealand) Gaz Whiter | Tectaloy Coolants (Driftcorp) | Nissan Silvia S14 |
| 2014–15 | (New Zealand) Darren Kelly | HiTec Oils Australia | Nissan Skyline R34 |
| 2016 | (New Zealand) Curt Whittaker | Rattla Motorsport | Nissan Skyline R34 |
| 2017 | (New Zealand) Cole Armstrong | Cole Armstrong Drift | Nissan Skyline G35 |
| 2018 | (New Zealand) Cole Armstrong | Cole Armstrong Drift | Nissan Skyline R34 |
| 2019 | (New Zealand) Darren Kelly | The Heart of Racing | Nissan GTR R35 |
| 2020 | (New Zealand) Liam Burke | Kiesel 888 Motorsport | Nissan Silvia S13 |
| 2021 | (New Zealand) Darren Kelly | The Heart of Racing | Nissan GTR R35 |
| 2022 | (New Zealand) "Fanga Dan" Woolhouse | Castrol Edge (Driftcorp) | Ford Mustang GT |
| 2023 | (New Zealand) "Fanga Dan" Woolhouse | Century Batteries (Driftcorp) | Ford Mustang GT |
| 2024 | (New Zealand) Kase Pullen-Burry | P-B DRIFT | Nissan Silvia S15 |
| 2025 | (Australia) Luke Fink | JDM Racing | Nissan Silvia S15 |

== List of Pro-Sport Champions ==
Formally referred to as Pro-Am from the 2010 - '11 season until its name change in 2015 - '16 to Pro-Sport.

| Year | Driver | Team | Vehicle |
|---|---|---|---|
| 2011 | (New Zealand) Nico Reid | Luxury Sports | Nissan Silvia S13 |
| 2012 | (New Zealand) Cameron Vernon | Sheep Shagga Racing | Nissan Skyline R32 |
| 2013 | (New Zealand) Darren Kelly | DKM Fabrication | Nissan Skyline R32 |
| 2014 | (New Zealand) Vincent Langhorn | Euphoric Motorsport | Nissan Laurel C33 |
| 2015 | (New Zealand) Troy Jenkins | Brian Roberts Towing (TJM) | Nissan Silvia S15 |
| 2016 | (New Zealand) Chad McKenzie | McKenzie Motorsport | Nissan Skyline R32 |
| 2017 | (New Zealand) Bruce Tannock | Mag & Turbo | Nissan Silvia S13 |
| 2018 | (New Zealand) Liam Burke | LBP Drift | Nissan Silvia S13 |
| 2019 | (New Zealand) Michael Thorley | Enzed | Nissan Laurel C33 |
| 2020 | (New Zealand) Russell Vare | 235 Drift | Nissan Laurel C33 |
| 2021 | (New Zealand) Shaun Potroz | SMP Motorsport | Nissan Silvia S14 |
| 2022 | (New Zealand) Connor Halligan | Halligan Racing | Nissan Silvia S14 |
| 2023 | (New Zealand) Kase Pullen-Burry | P-B Drift | Nissan Silvia S14.9 |
| 2024 | (Japan) (New Zealand) Keisuke Nagashima | Torque Performance (86Fighters) | Toyota Corolla AE86 (SR20DET) |
| 2025 | (New Zealand) Deane Young | Young Drift | Nissan Silvia S13 |

== See also ==
- Drifting (motorsport)
- D1 Grand Prix
- Formula D
