= Daniel Woolhouse =

- Born: 31 March 1983 (age 43) Hastings, New Zealand

D1NZ Championship Series career
- Debut season: 2005
- Current team: Driftcorp Driftcorp
- Car number: 01
- Former teams: Castrol Edge Goodyear Racing Dunlop Direzza
- Best finish: 1st in 2006, 2013, 2022, 2023

Previous series
- 2010: Formula Drift Asia NZ Drift Series

Championship titles
- 2006, 2013, 2022, 2023: D1NZ Drift King

Awards
- 2013: 2013 New Zealand Champion 2nd Place BP Triple Crown 2012 D1NZ Drift Ambassador

Daniel Woolhouse, also known as "Fanga Dan", is a four-time D1NZ Champion and professional drifting driver from Whangārei, New Zealand.

Competing with the iconic Driftcorp team, Woolhouse began drifting competitively in 2003, entering his first full season in 2005 driving a Nissan Laurel C33 in the D1NZ National Drifting Championship and finishing third overall in his rookie year. Moving to a purpose-built Nissan S15 Silvia, he would go on to win the 2006 D1NZ Championship in just his second year of competition, also becoming the third Driftcorp driver to win a national title.

In 2008, Woolhouse built and drove one of the first Holden VZ Commodores in competitive drifting, powered by a 2.6-litre (160-cubic-inch) Nissan RB engine.

In 2010, Woolhouse represented New Zealand and competed in Thailand, Singapore and Malaysia driving for Goodyear Racing in the Holden VZ Commodore, claiming wins and podium finishes in Formula Drift Asia and the Goodyear International Drift Series. He competed overseas again in 2011 and 2012, driving for Castrol Edge in the Tectaloy International Drift Challenge as part of the annual World Time Attack event in Sydney, Australia.

After retiring his championship winning Nissan S15 in 2010, now driven by Driftcorp team-mate Robee Nelson, Woolhouse went on to compete an LS2 V8-powered Holden VZ Commodore in the 2013 D1NZ Championship Series for his naming rights sponsor, Castrol Edge, in which he became the 2013 New Zealand drift champion.
