= Nissan Cefiro =

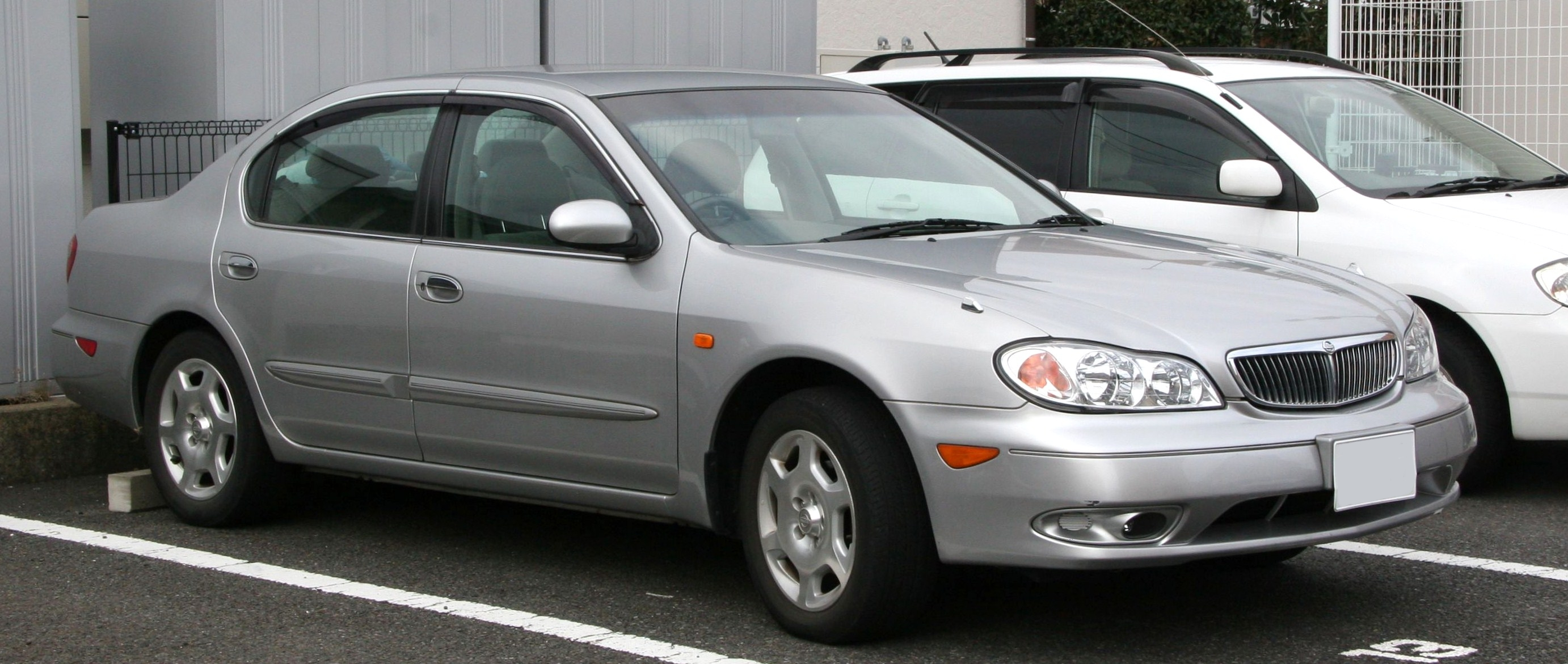
- Nissan Cefiro (A33) in Japan.

Overview
- Manufacturer: Nissan
- Production: 1988–2004
- Assembly: Japan: Oppama Plant, Yokosuka, Kanagawa (1994–2004); Thailand: Samut Prakan (Siam Motors, 1990–2004); Philippines: Makati (1991–1998); Santa Rosa (1998–2007); Iran: Tehran (Pars Khodro); South Korea: Busan (Samsung Motors); Taiwan: Miaoli (Yulon Motors); Malaysia: Kuala Lumpur, Serendah (Edaran Tan Chong Motor (ETCM))

Body and chassis
- Class: Mid-size
- Body style: 4-door sedan 5-door station wagon (A32)
- Related: Nissan Maxima; Renault Samsung SM5

Chronology
- Predecessor: Nissan Skyline (Middle East)
- Successor: Nissan Teana (Japan, Taiwan, Southeast Asia); Nissan Maxima (Middle East)

The Nissan Cefiro (Japanese: 日産・セフィーロ, Hepburn: Nissan Sefīro) is a mid-size passenger car manufactured and marketed by Nissan Motors over three generations. Almost all Cefiro's were marketed as four-door sedans, though a five-door wagon body style was briefly available (1997–2000). In most cases, the Cefiro used Nissan's VQ six-cylinder engines, named Ward's 10 Best Engines more than ten years running.

Nissan marketed the Cefiro in the Japanese Domestic Market (JDM) as well as worldwide, the latter under numerous badge-engineered nameplates, including as the Nissan Maxima (North America, Australia), Samsung SM5 (Korea), Infiniti I30 and Infiniti I35 (North America) and Maxima QX (Europe, Russia). Models manufactured under license were marketed in Indonesia, Malaysia and Taiwan.

The first generation Cefiro (internally designated the A31, 1988–1994), used rear-wheel drive; offered four- and six-cylinder engines; and became popular in motorsport drifting. The second generation (A32, 1995–1998) and third generation (A33, 1995–2004) used exclusively a front-wheel drive and V6 engine drivetrain. After the A31, A32 and A33 generations, Nissan would also later use the Cefiro nameplate on examples of its first generation Teana (J31) sedan — exported to Asian and Latin American markets. The model codes A34, A35, and A36 later became the designations for the Maxima, which had evolved from a badge-engineered version of the Cefiro starting with the A32 generation.

Nissan began using the Cefiro nameplate - derived from zephyr, the name given in Greek mythology to the god of "the wind from the west" - in 1988; the nameplate was officially retired in 2012.

== First generation (A31, 1988–1994) ==
A31
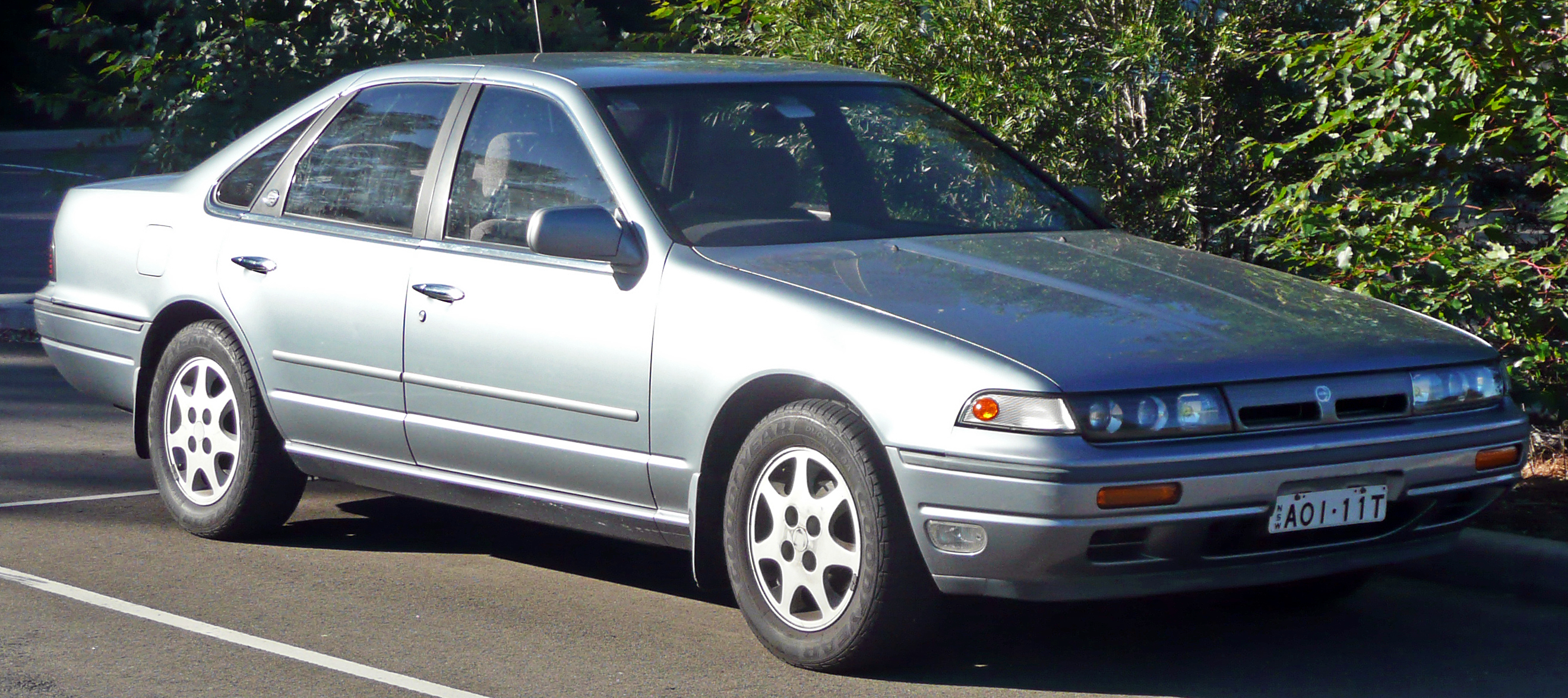
- 1988–1990 Nissan Cefiro

Overview
- Model code: A31
- Also called: Nissan Laurel Altima
- Production: 1988–1994
- Assembly: Japan: Musashimurayama, Tokyo (Musashimurayama Plant) and Zama, Kanagawa (Zama Plant); Indonesia: Cikampek, West Java (PT. Nayaka Wirawan); Thailand: Samut Prakan (Siam Motors)
- Designer: Satoshi Wada

Body and chassis
- Body style: 4-door sedan
- Layout: Front-engine, rear-wheel-drive or "ATTESA E-TS" all-wheel-drive
- Related: Nissan Laurel (C33); Nissan Leopard (F31); Nissan Skyline (R32)

Powertrain
- Engine: 2.0 L CA20S I4 (PA31); 2.0 L RB20E I6 (LA31/LCA31); 2.0 L RB20DE DOHC I6 (LA31/LCA31); 2.0 L RB20DET turbo DOHC I6 (LA31/LCA31/LNA31); 2.4 L RB24S I6 (MA31); 2.5 L RB25DE DOHC I6 (EA31/ECA31)
- Transmission: 5-speed RE5R01A automatic; 4-speed RE4R01A automatic; 5-speed FS5W71C manual

Dimensions
- Wheelbase: 2,670 mm (105.1 in)
- Length: 4,690 mm (184.6 in) (1988–1992); 4,765 mm (187.6 in) (1992–1994); 4,710 mm (185.4 in) (export)
- Width: 1,695 mm (66.7 in) (1988–1992); 1,705 mm (67.1 in) (1992–1994)
- Height: 1,375 mm (54.1 in); 1,390 mm (54.7 in) (AWD)
- Curb weight: 1,165–1,510 kg (2,568.4–3,329.0 lb)

Nissan released the all-new A31 series Cefiro sedan to Japan in September 1988, sharing its transmission, chassis, engine and suspension with the Skyline (R32), Leopard (F31), and Laurel (C33) — except the diesel engine, which was available only in the Laurel. The ATTESA E-TS AWD drivetrain was offered after the mid-model refresh and was borrowed from the Skyline, which the Laurel traditionally shared. The Cefiro replaced the Leopard sedan, which was changed to be offered only as a coupé.

The Cefiro rivaled the Toyota Mark II (X80), the luxurious Toyota Cresta (X80) and performance Toyota Chaser (X80) triplets, with Nissan offering the Cefiro as a comparable fourth alternative to the Laurel and Skyline models, selling each vehicle at a separate Nissan dealership (Nissan Motor Store for the Laurel, Nissan Prince Store for the Skyline, Nissan Satio Store for the Leopard, and Nissan Store for the Cefiro). This marketing approach of offering three different versions of the exact vehicle was used earlier with the Auster/Stanza/Violet (A10) RWD sedans during the 1980s.

The model code "A31" was chosen as the number combination "A30" was previously used by the 1967–1971 Gloria soon after Nissan had merged with the Prince Motor Company. The Cefiro was a performance companion at Nissan Store, with exterior dimensions the same as the Cedric (Y31) (exclusive to Nissan Store) and the Gloria (exclusive to Nissan Prince Store), but on a shorter wheelbase.

Brand new, the Cefiro was slightly more expensive than the equivalent Skyline/Laurel and benefited from Project 901 offered for the first time projector beam headlights, automatic tinting rear vision cabin mirror, electrically adjustable seats, automatic headlights, and steering wheel mounted radio controls. HICAS-II four-wheel steering (CA31), "Super Sonic Suspension (DUET-SS)" or ATTESA E-TS all-wheel drive (NA31) suspension packages could be ordered separately but not combined.

The suspension was shared with the Skyline, Leopard, and Laurel, using MacPherson struts for the front wheels and a semi-trailing arm suspension for the rear. If the Cefiro was installed with the "Super Sonic Suspension" system, a sonar module mounted under the front bumper and scanned the road surface, adjusting the suspension accordingly via actuators mounted on all four coilover struts and the front suspension was installed with a multi-link setup. There was also a switch on the center console that allowed the driver to change between "Auto," "Soft," "Medium," and "Hard" settings. The speed-sensitive rack-and-pinion power steering could also be separately reduced for a sporting feeling, and the suspension setting would modify both the steering feel and the shift points on the automatic transmission.

Its equipment and features helped justify the moderately high annual road tax bill to Japanese buyers. However, the exterior dimensions and engine displacement (on models equipped with 2.0-liter engines) remained within "compact" class size regulations, keeping demand high. The Cefiro was marketed towards affluent married couples without children during the years before the "bubble economy" began. The Cefiro could be customized and ordered from several combinations of engines, suspensions, transmissions, interior fabrics, interior colors, and exterior colors according to their preferences. Also available was a modification to the front passenger seat of Nissan called the "Partner Comfort Seat," where the top portion of the front passenger seat was further articulated to tilt forward, supporting the passenger's shoulders while allowing the seatback structure to recline. At the time of its introduction, there were 810 possible combinations. The A31 Cefiros can identify the combined specifications ordered by looking at the specification sheet affixed to the inside of the center armrest console lid.

Initially, the Cefiro sold in Japan is only fitted with the single-cam and twin-cam RB20 inline-six engines, along with a turbocharged selection RB20DET. Trim levels were determined by combining the engine choice with the selected suspension system. The regular trim levels without the optional special suspension systems were called Town Ride (RB20E), Touring (RB20DE) and Cruising (RB20DET). Furthermore, the Comfort prefix was used for models with the DUET-SS suspension, while the Sports prefix was used for those with HICAS-II four-wheel steering. For example, a model equipped with the twin-cam RB20DE engine and the HICAS-II option was called the Sports Touring (CA31).

In January 1990, a special Autech Version was launched, based on the Sports Cruising model. This edition was distinguished by new aero bumpers, PIAA 15-inch alloy wheels, upgraded audio system, Italvolanti steering wheel and an interior outfitted with a Connolly leather door panels and seats. Under the hood, specialized engine tuning bumped the output to 225 PS (165 kW; 222 hp). In August 1990, Nissan facelifted the Cefiro with a revised front bumper, grille, taillights, center console, and cabin fabrics. The trim levels were also adjusted; the Comfort and Sports prefixes were abolished, a new 5-speed automatic transmission to the Touring trim and the ATTESA E-TS AWD system became optional for the turbocharged Cruising trim.

The car underwent another facelift in May 1992 with another new front bumper, grille and taillights. The trim levels were changed again in this update, resulting the simpler trim designations; VL and SE (RB20E), VE (RB20DE), and SE-T and SE-4 (RB20DET). Additionally, the RB25DE 2.5-liter engine was introduced for the 25SE trim, which came standard with a 5-speed automatic transmission. The model codes were updated to reflect these changes; the new 2.5-liter models were designated as EA31 and ECA31, while the 2.0-liter RB20 models were updated to LA31, LCA31, and LNA31.

Nissan took the unusual step of marketing the export version of the Cefiro A31 in the Caribbean islands, Latin America, Turkey, Gulf States and other Eurasian countries as the Nissan Laurel Altima – in most export markets this slot was replaced by the Maxima (J30). Unlike the Japanese versions, the Laurel Altima is fitted with a carbureted single-cam CA20S 2.0-liter inline-four producing 90 PS (66 kW; 89 hp) and RB24S which was a carbureted single-cam 2.4-liter inline-six producing 126 PS (93 kW; 124 hp). The 2.0-liter model was available exclusively in left-hand drive markets; it was sold in GL and SGL trims and assigned the PA31 model code. In contrast, the 2.4-liter model was marketed in GT, GTS and GTS-R trims under the MA31 model code, and was available in both left- and right-hand drive markets. In other region like Southeast Asia, the Cefiro name was retained and featured a unique hybrid look of the Laurel Altima’s front bumper with the Japanese-market Cefiro grille. Depending on the country, engine options in this region were limited to three inline-sixes: the fuel-injected, single-cam RB20E, the twin-cam RB20DE, and the carbureted RB24S. In certain markets like Indonesia and Thailand, the DUET-SS electric suspension is offered as standard equipment.

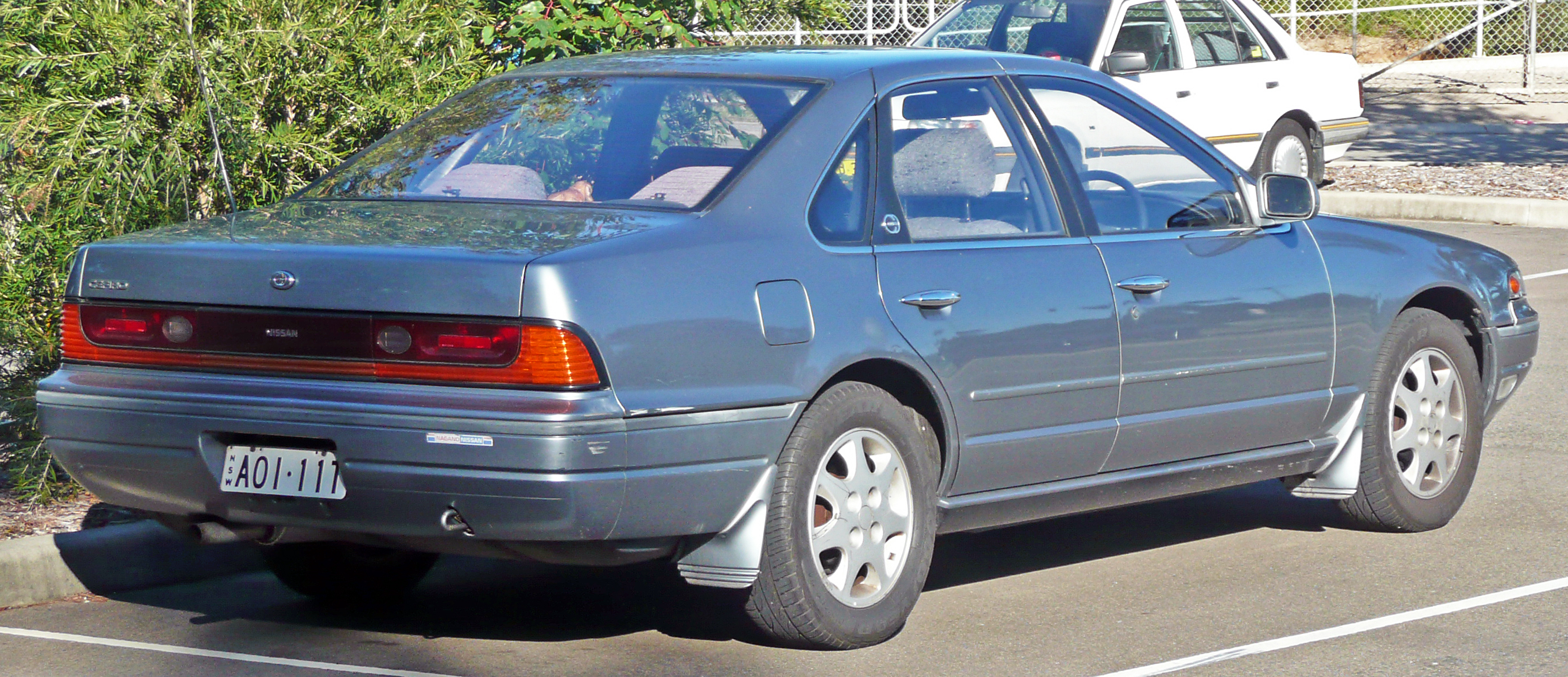
1988–1990 Nissan Cefiro

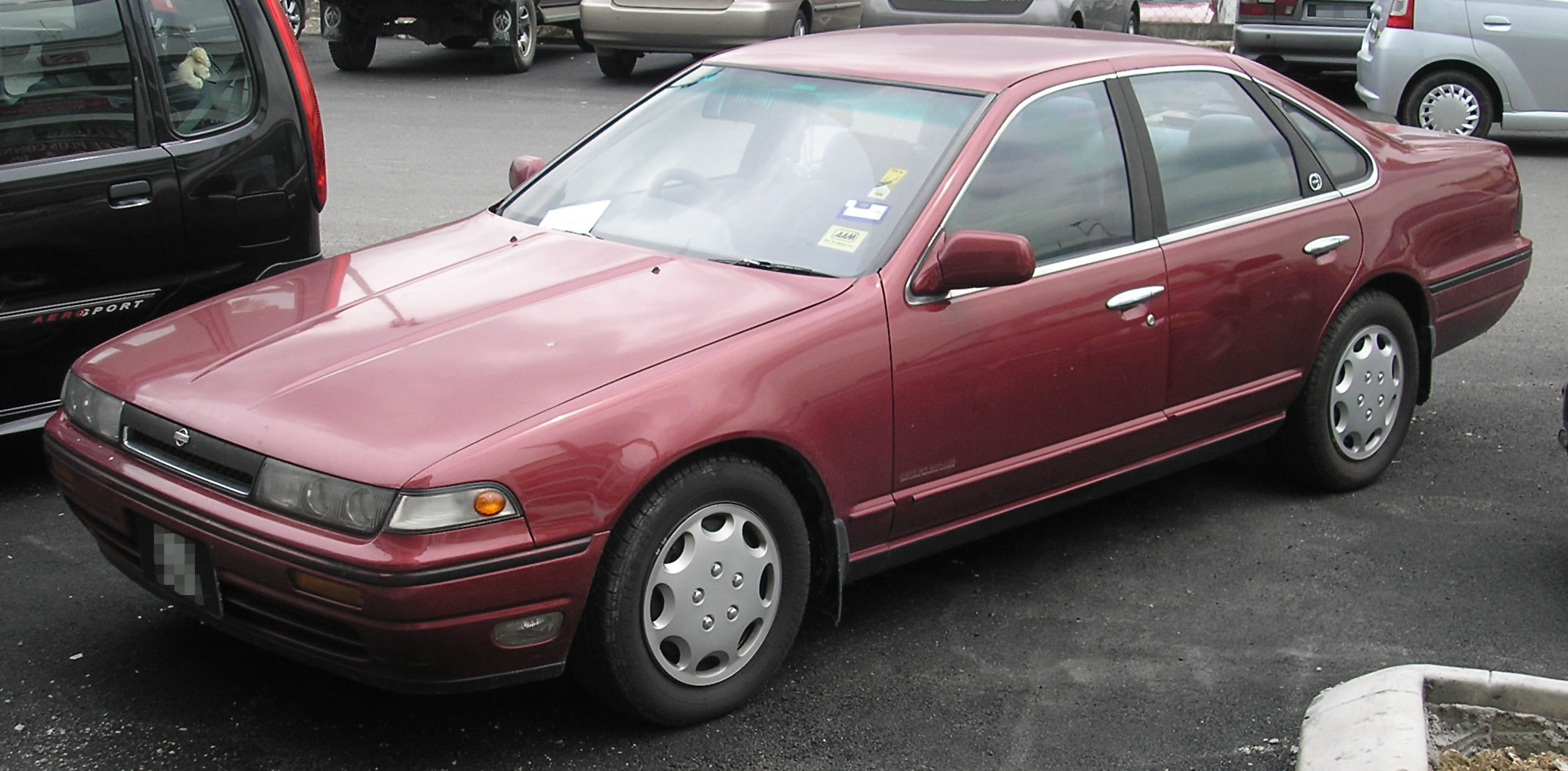
1990–1992 Nissan Cefiro

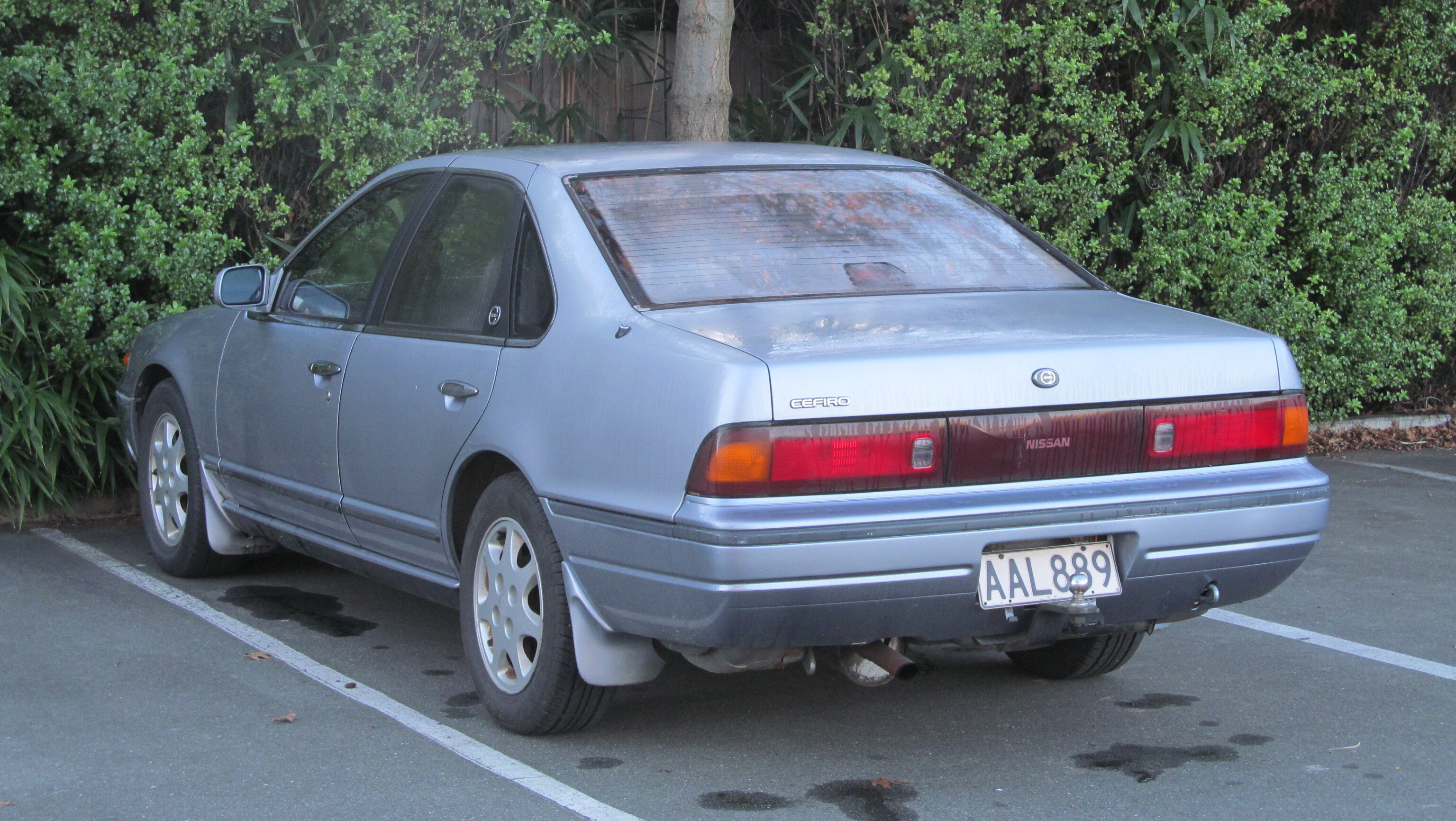
1990–1992 Nissan Cefiro

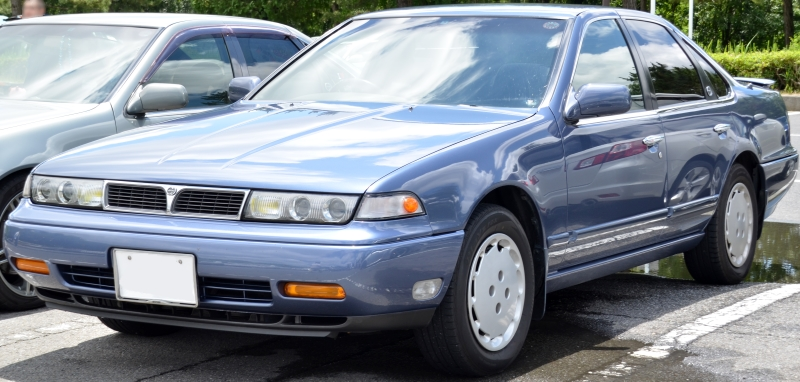
1992–1994 Nissan Cefiro

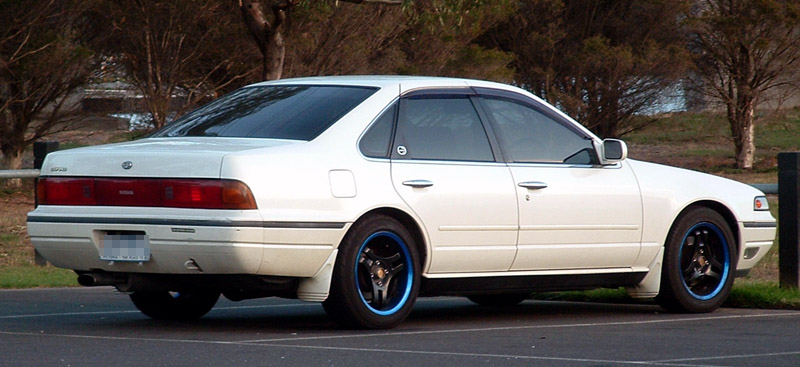
1992–1994 Nissan Cefiro

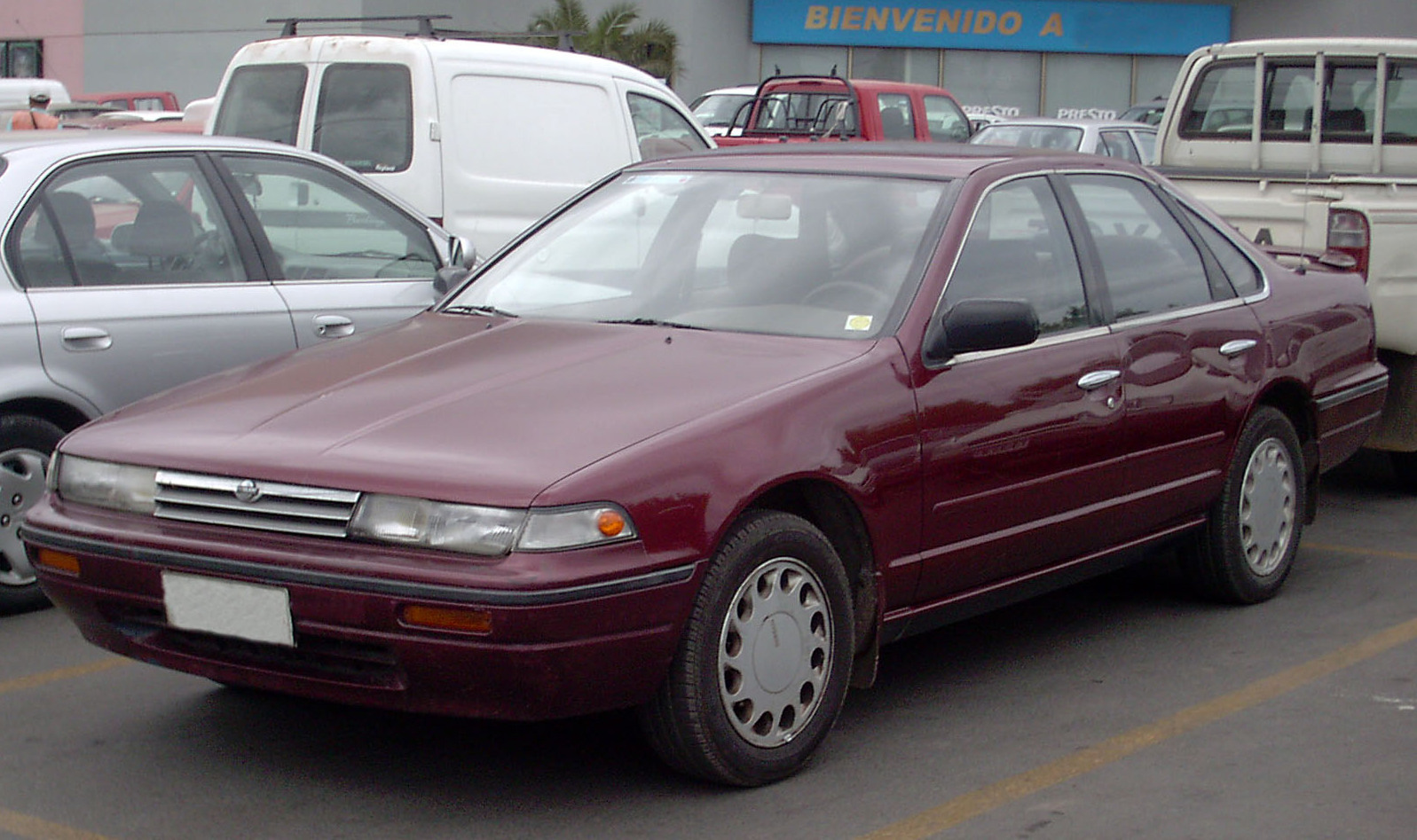
1988–1992 Nissan Laurel Altima

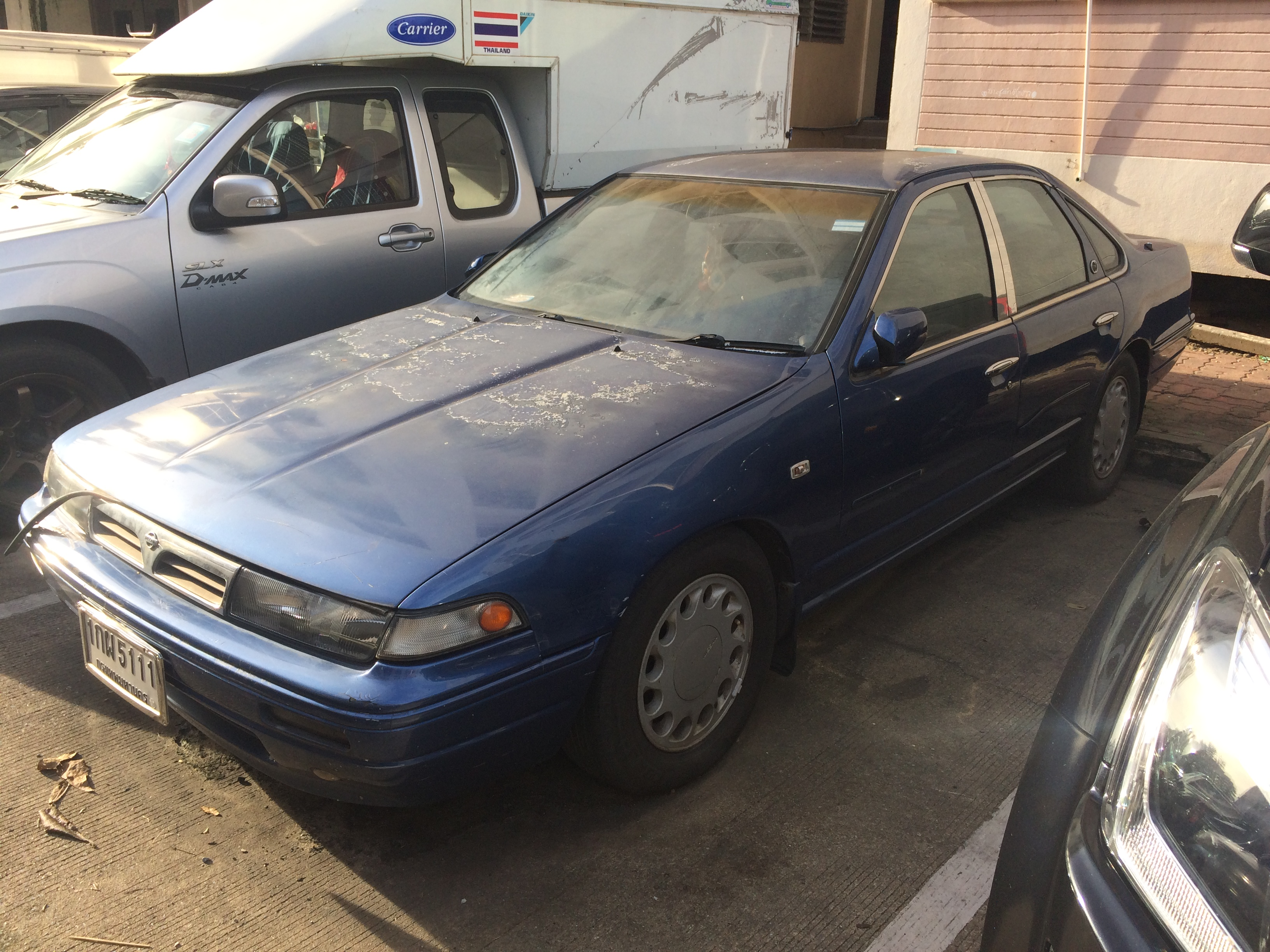
1992–1994 Nissan Laurel Altima

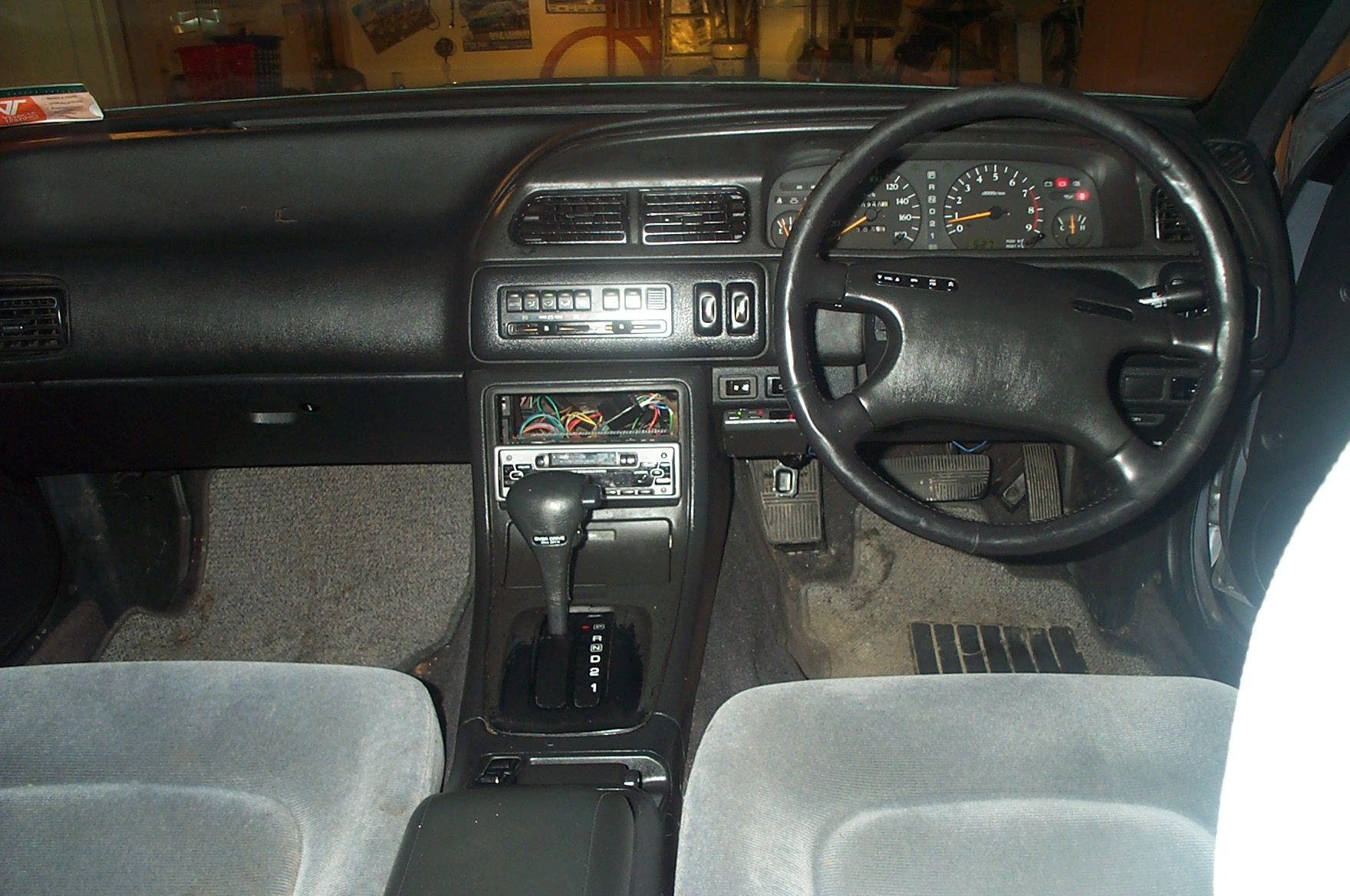
Interior

== Second generation (A32, 1994–1998) ==
A32
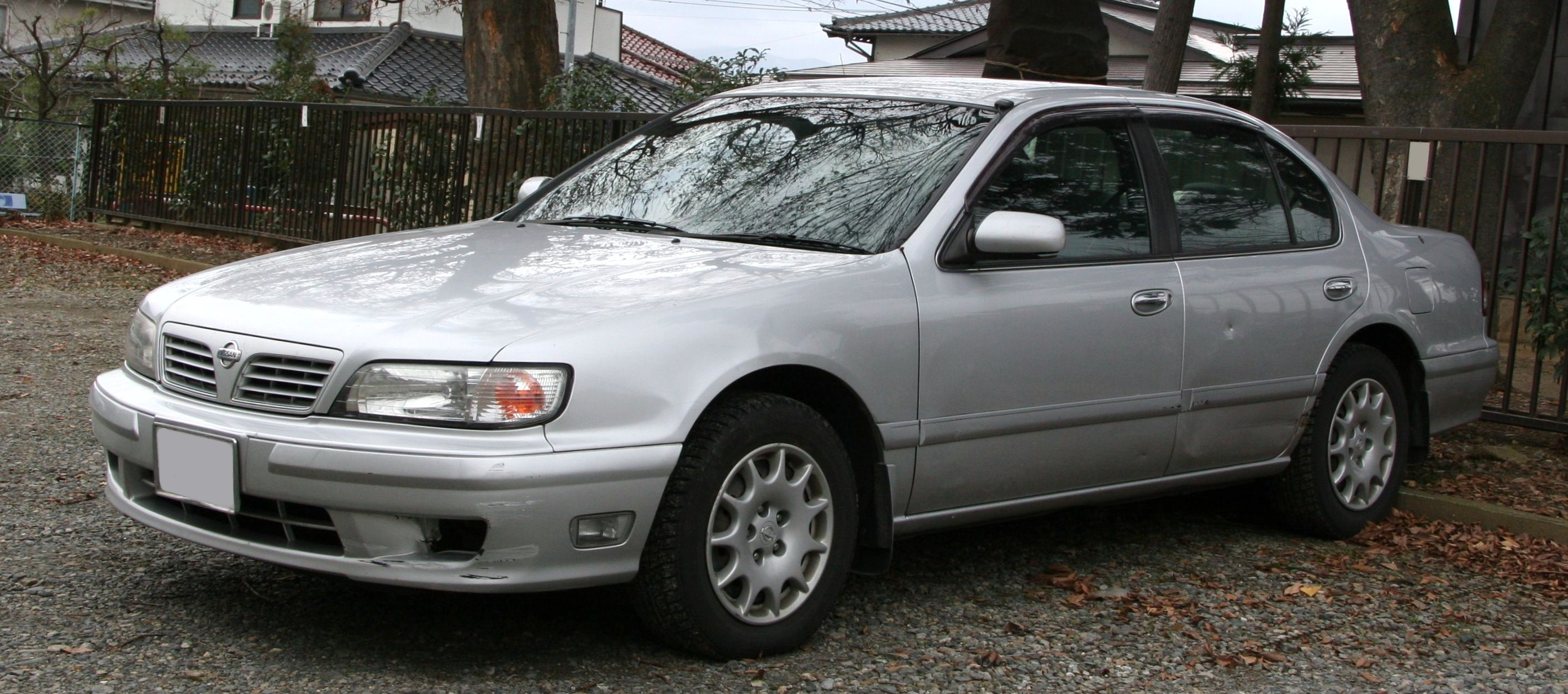

Overview
- Also called: Nissan Maxima; Nissan Maxima QX; Nissan QX (UK); Infiniti I30; Renault Samsung SM5
- Production: 1994–1998 (sedan); 1997–2000 (wagon)
- Model years: 1996–1999

Body and chassis
- Body style: 4-door sedan 5-door station wagon
- Layout: Front-engine, front-wheel-drive

Powertrain
- Engine: 2.0 L VQ20DE V6; 2.5 L VQ25DE V6; 3.0 L VQ30DE V6
- Transmission: 4-speed automatic 5-speed manual

Dimensions
- Wheelbase: 2,700 mm (106.3 in)
- Length: 4,815 mm (189.6 in)
- Width: 1,770 mm (69.7 in)
- Height: 1,415 mm (55.7 in)
- Curb weight: 1,340 kg (2,954.2 lb)

Chronology
- Predecessor: Infiniti J30 (for Infiniti I30)

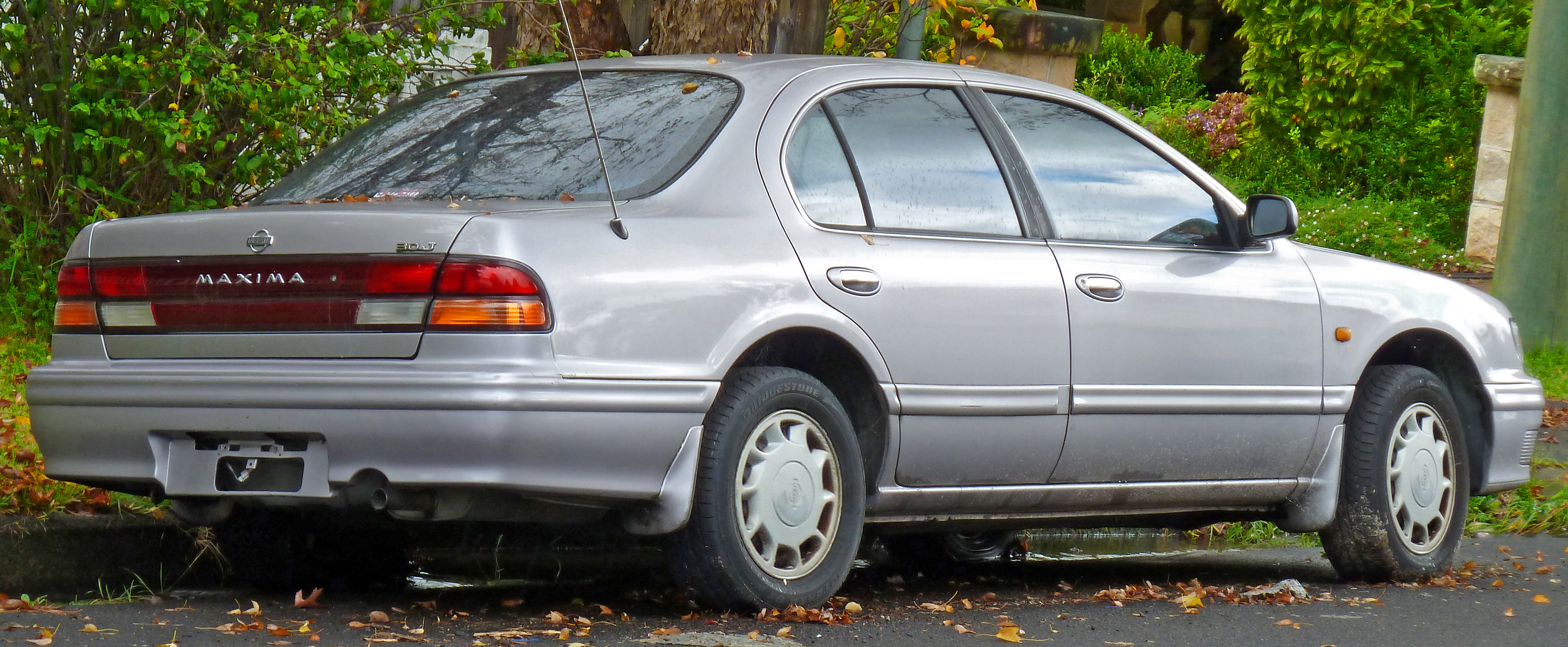
Pre-facelift Nissan Maxima 30J (Australia)

Nissan debuted the A32 series Cefiro for the domestic Japanese market in August 1994. Generally, the A32 was only badged as the Cefiro for the JDM; exported A32s often carried the Maxima badge. The A32 was marketed as the "Nissan Maxima QX" in Europe. The 2- and 3-liter engines were offered in export markets, while the mid-range 2.5 was only available in the home market. The Cefiro received a light facelift in January 1997, including new multi-reflector head- and taillights. Sportier models received black backing in the headlamps, while more comfort-oriented versions were chromed. There were also minor changes to the interior and the trim around the door frames, while ABS and airbags became standard across the range in the home market.

The A32's character changed with its new front-wheel drive configuration and Nissan's VQ six-cylinder engines. Four-wheel drive was not available in this and the next generation. The JDM Cefiro was also offered as a wagon beginning in June 1997 as an alternative to the Toyota Mark II Qualis. The Cefiro Wagon (WA32) continued to be produced after the sedan's discontinuation, only being eliminated in August 2000.

In Taiwan, the Cefiro A32 was manufactured by Yulon under the Nissan brand. Most Southeast Asian countries (for example, Malaysia, Singapore, and Thailand) adopted the Cefiro name. In South Korea, it was badge engineered and introduced as the Renault Samsung SM5.

In the Philippines, the Cefiro A32 replaced the A31 Cefiro in 1997. It is powered by Nissan's 2.0-litre VQ20DE V6 engine paired to a 4-speed automatic transmission.

In 2000, Nissan introduced an all-new trim, "Brougham VIP," borrowed from the Nissan Cedric and Gloria top-trim level packages. The "Brougham VIP" is powered by the same 2.0L V6 engine mated to a 4-speed automatic transmission. It featured a redesigned grille, headlight & taillight.

By 2002, a new "Elite" trim was added alongside the "Brougham VIP" trim. Nissan's 2.0L V6 engine still powers both trims mated to a 4-speed automatic transmission respectively. The new "Elite" trim featured power-adjustable seats, faux wood trim, a full leather interior with tufted seats, and a re-designed 6-speaker audio system with 6 CD/VCD changers. The "Brougham VIP" trim received different wheel designs, a unique pagcor emblem, automatic climate control, and a power moon roof.

By 2004, Nissan introduced another new trim called "300EX". The "300EX" is now powered by Nissan's 3.0-litre VQ30DE V6 engine paired to a standard automatic transmission with sport mode. It featured different wheel designs, leather interior & seats, keyless entry, rear armrests, rear aircon vents, factory fitted alarm, immobilizer, power rear windshield sun visor, among other features.

=== Infiniti I30 ===
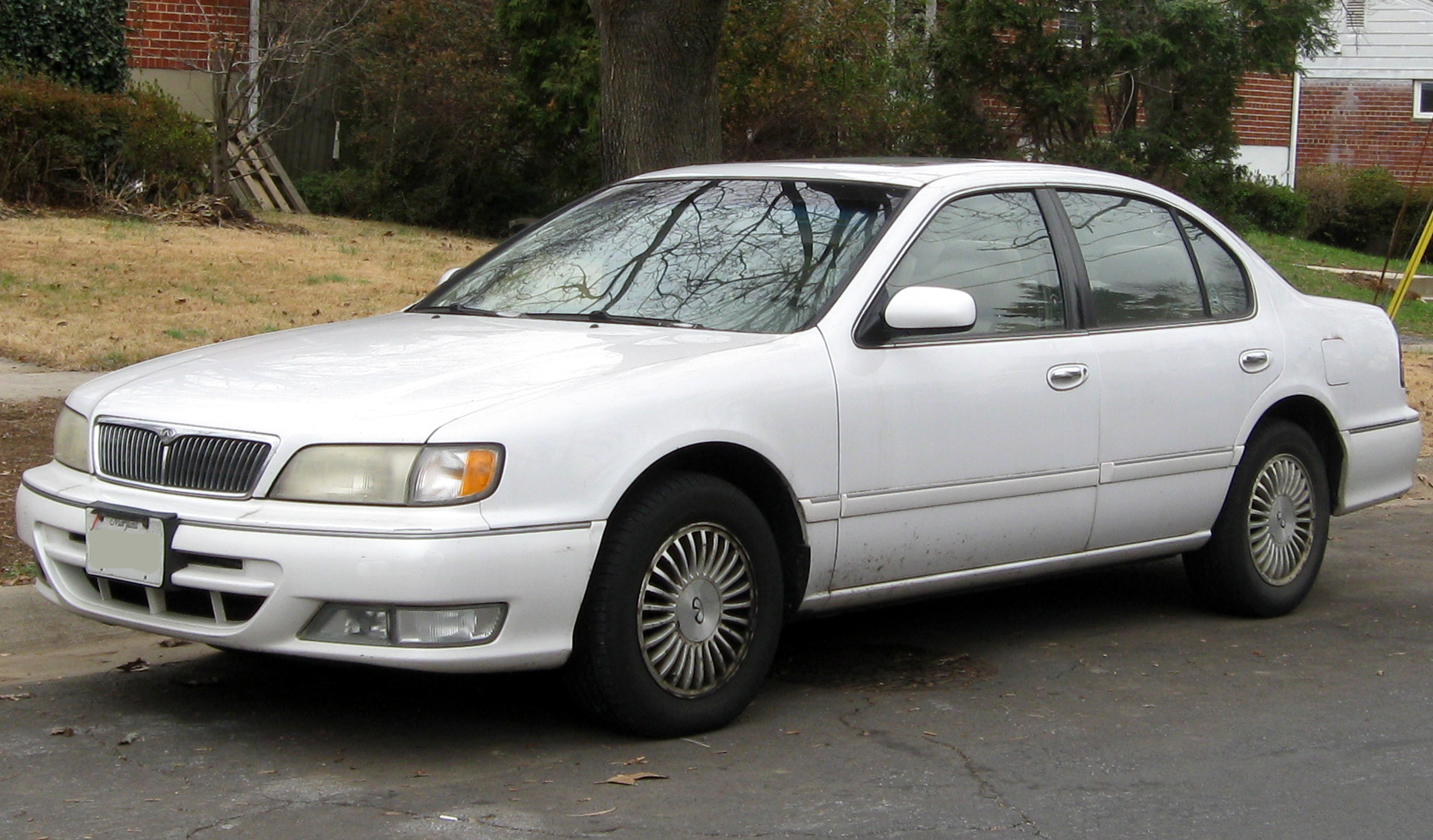
Infiniti I30 (US)

Infiniti launched the Cefiro in North America as the Infiniti I30 for model year 1996, manufactured at Oppama, Japan (where the Maxima was built), commencing June 27, 1995. To reduce ambiguity in the nameplate, the rear I30 emblem used two fonts: a cursive letter "I" combined with a serif font for the "30", eliminating the possibility the emblem would be read as "130".

As Infiniti's top seller then, the I30 was the brand's all-new mid-level model, replacing the Infiniti J30. The I30 was positioned between the top-level, all-new Q45 and the all-new, entry-level Primera-based Infiniti G20. The Infiniti I30 was also marketed in Indonesia. In January 1997, the Cefiro "Brown Selection" was added to the lineup in Japan; this model was equipped with the I30's chromed front grille and a brown interior.

The I30 shared the 3.0-liter VQ30DE V6 engine producing 190 hp (142 kW) with the North American Maxima. Revisions to the I30 over the generation included revised tail lights and trunk garnish. The Touring model, I30t, gained five-spoke alloy wheels, more firm suspension tuning, and a spoiler and BBS wheels. A small number of first-generation I30s had five-speed manual transmissions, many with VLSD. An in-dash hands-free car phone was available as an option.

=== Gallery ===
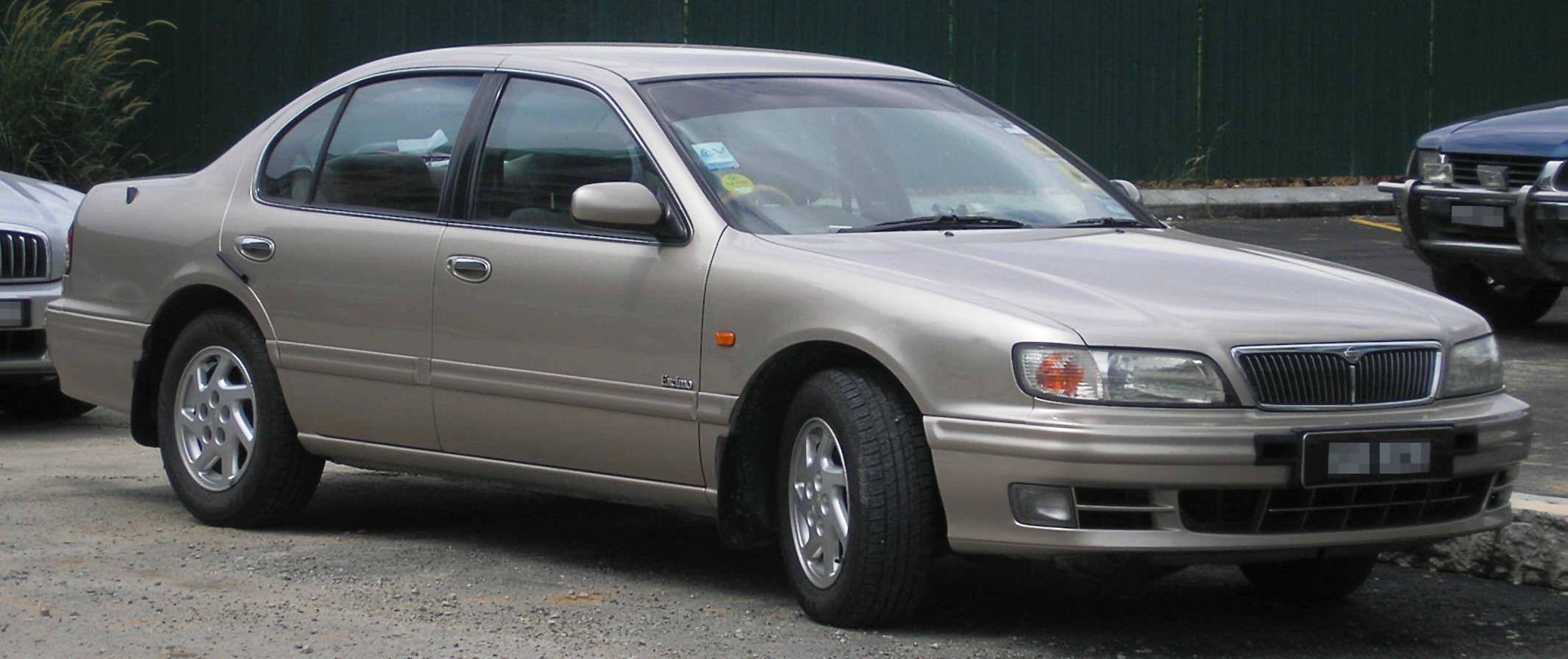
Facelift Nissan Cefiro 20G (Southeast Asia)

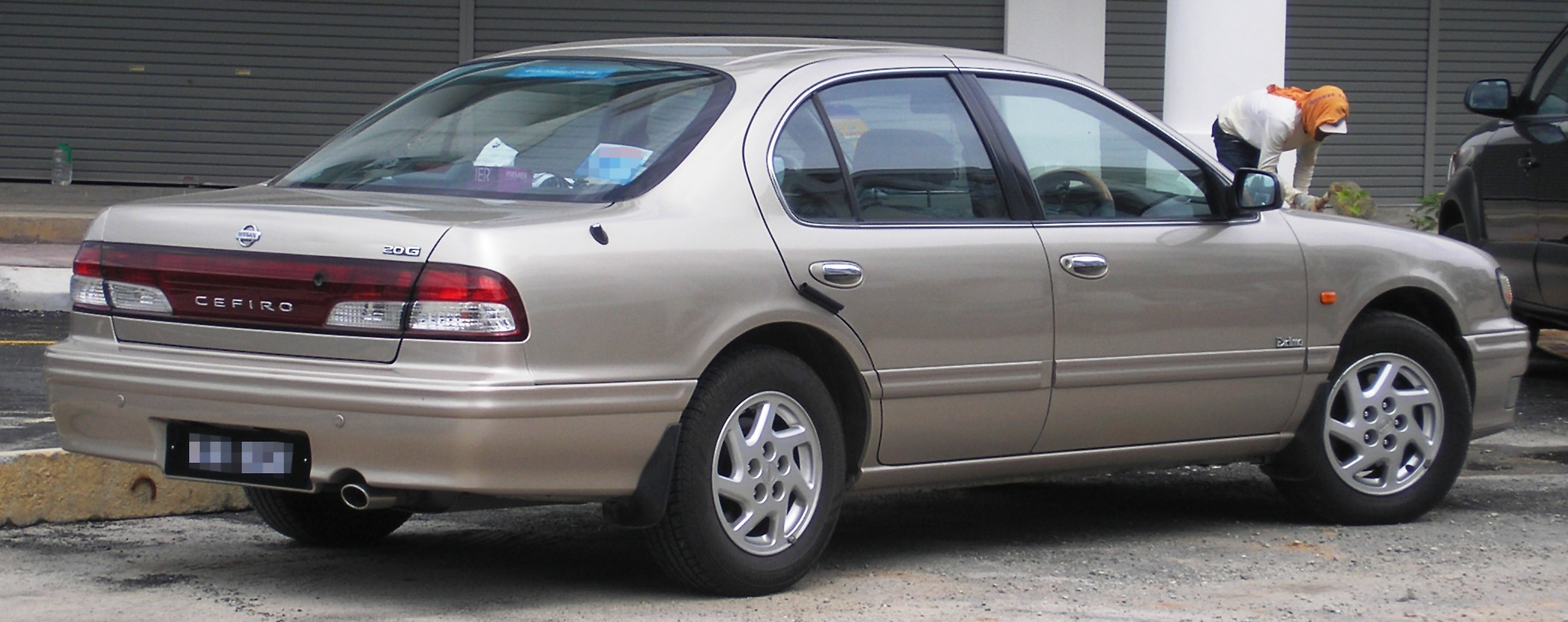
Facelift Nissan Cefiro 20G (Southeast Asia)

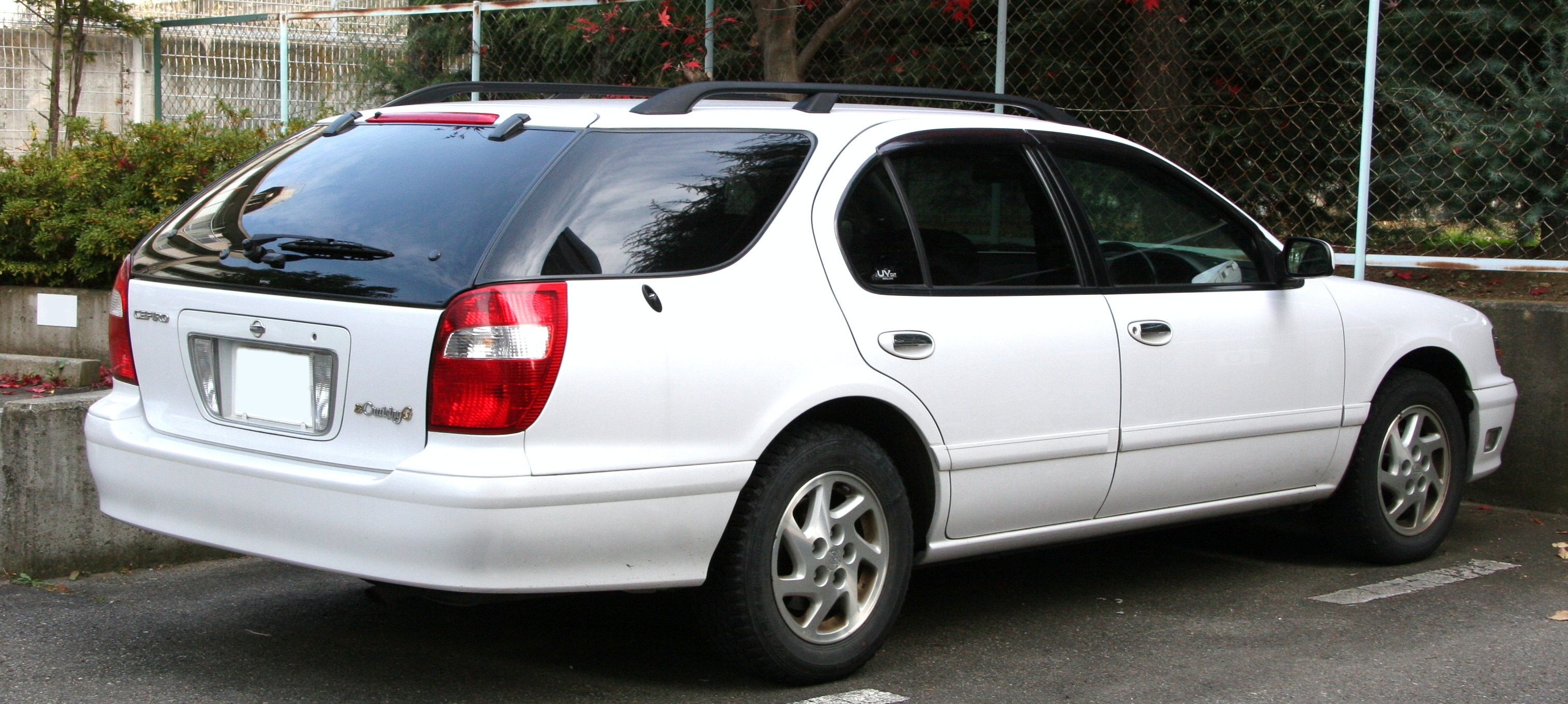
Nissan Cefiro Cruising G wagon (Japan)

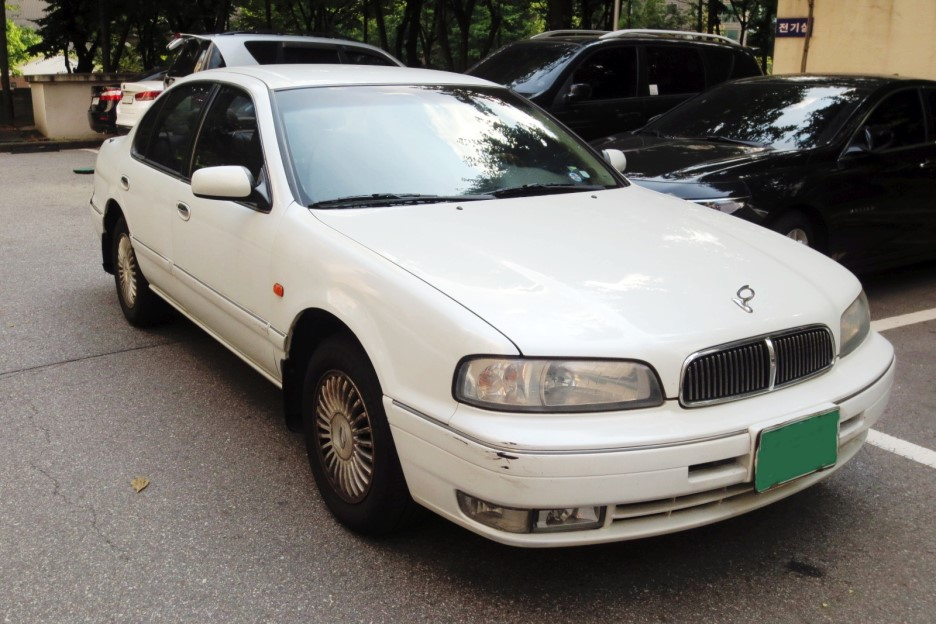
Samsung SM5 (South Korea)

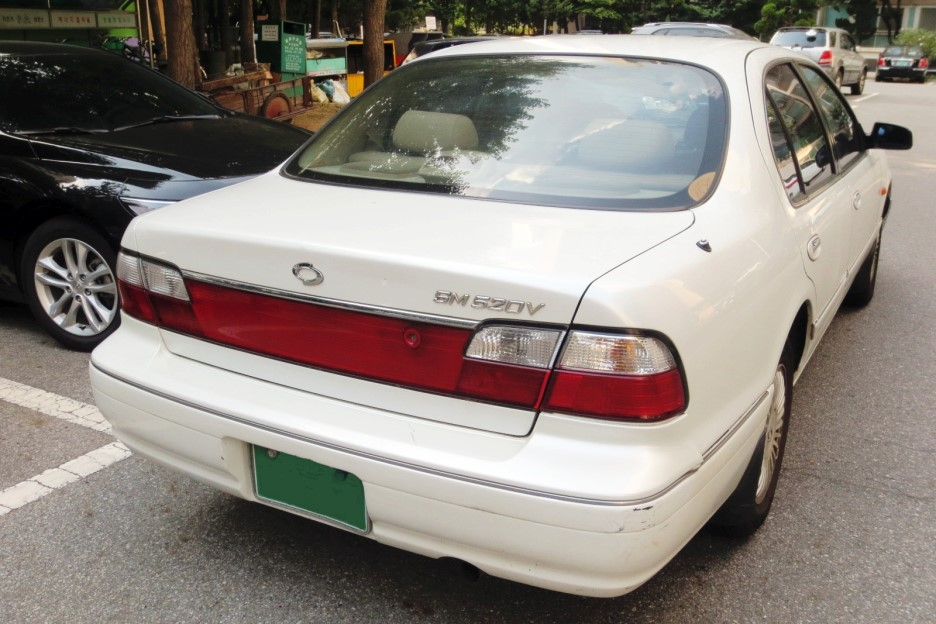
Samsung SM5 (South Korea)

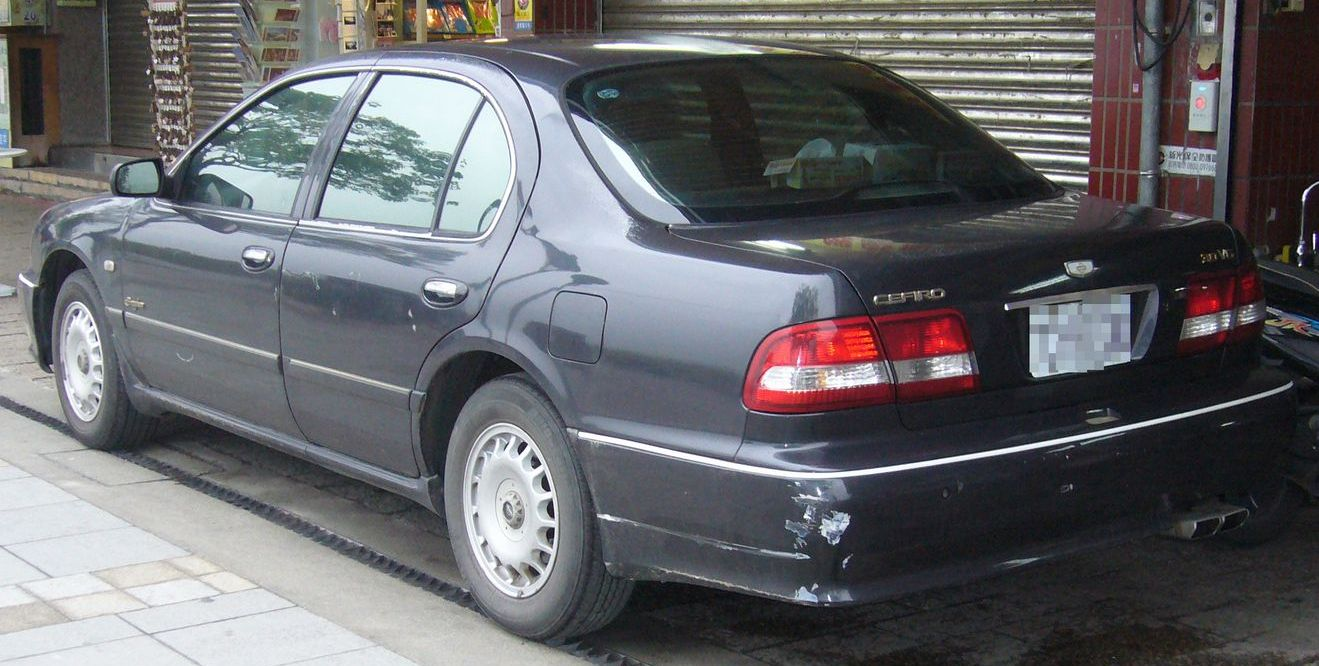
Nissan Cefiro (Taiwan) with rear license plate mounted on the trunk.

== Third generation (A33, 1998–2004) ==
A33
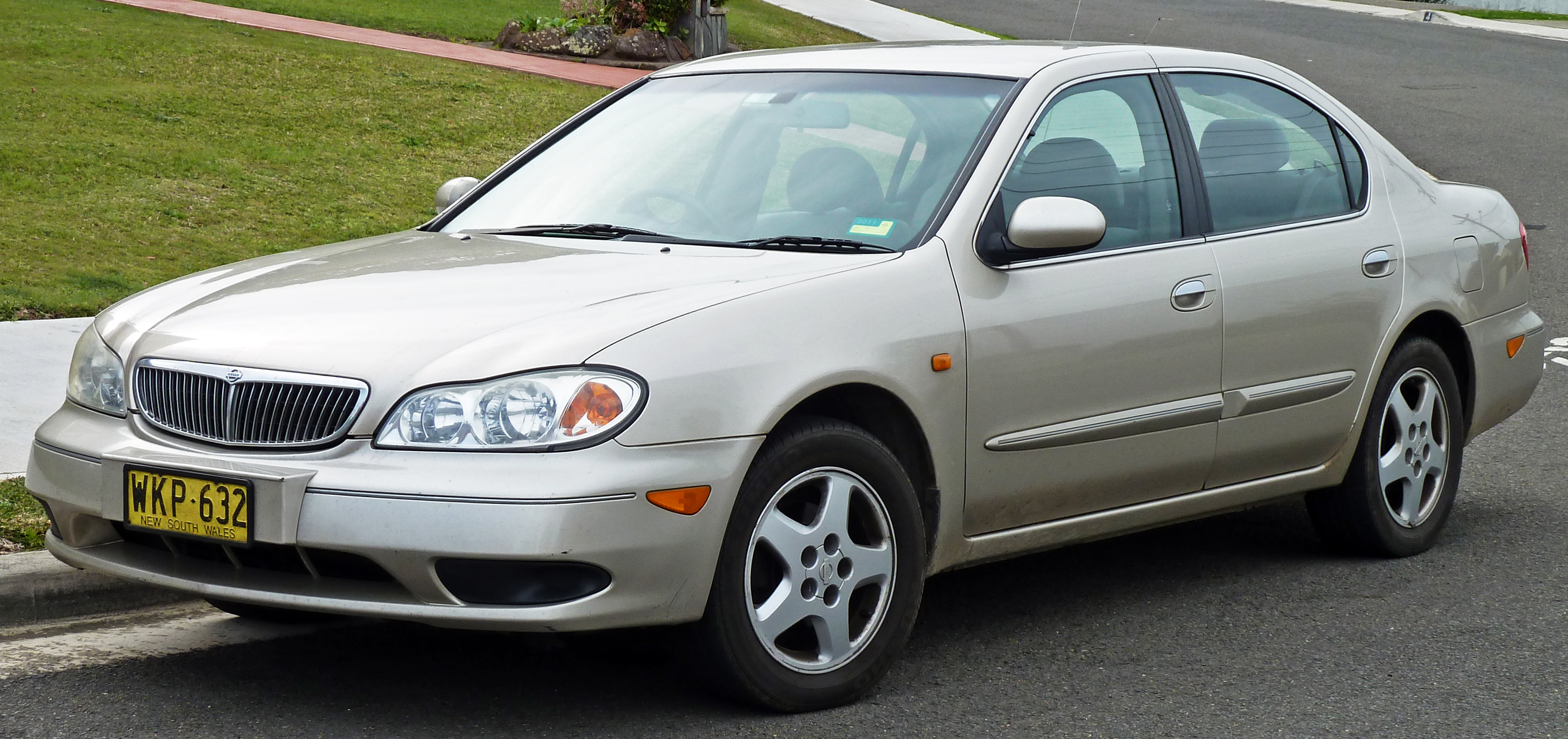

Overview
- Also called: Nissan Maxima; Nissan Maxima QX; Infiniti I30; Infiniti I35
- Production: 1998–2004; 2002–2012 (Iran); 2001–2008 (Southeast Asia)
- Model years: 2000–2001 (I30); 2002–2004 (I35); 2000–2008 (GCC)

Body and chassis
- Body style: 4-door sedan
- Layout: Front-engine, front-wheel-drive

Powertrain
- Engine: 2.0 L VQ20DE V6; 2.5 L VQ25DE V6; 2.5 L VQ25DD NEO-Di V6; 3.0 L VQ30DE-K V6; 3.5 L VQ35DE V6
- Transmission: 4-speed automatic 5-speed manual

Dimensions
- Wheelbase: 2,750 mm (108.3 in)
- Length: 4,785 mm (188.4 in) (JDM pre-facelift); 4,920 mm (193.7 in) (others)
- Width: 1,785 mm (70.3 in)
- Height: 1,438–1,450 mm (56.6–57.1 in)
- Curb weight: 1,380–1,460 kg (3,042–3,219 lb)

Chronology
- Successor: Nissan Maxima (A35) (Middle East)

Nissan released its A33 series in December 1998 initially as the JDM Cefiro, subsequently marketing badge engineered variants worldwide — prominently under its North American Infiniti brand as the I30 and I35.

For the Japanese Domestic Market (JDM), Nissan offered the A33 in 2.0 and 2.5 Excimo, 2.0 and 2.5 Excimo G, 2.0 and 2.5 S Touring, and 3.0 Brougham VIP trim levels. A five-speed manual transmission was offered for the 2.0 Excimo and 2.0 S Touring. The limited edition "L Selection" and modified Autech version were also offered in Japan. In January 2001 the Cefiro received a facelift, incorporating the larger bumpers used on export models and the Infiniti I30. In some markets, the final A33 facelift brings some appearance design changes resembling the unofficially named A34 in Taiwanese market, featuring larger headlamps and front grille, slightly recessed bumpers, and redesigned tail lights sporting a dotted LED-like design.

=== Worldwide ===
In Australia, Nissan marketed the A33 as the Maxima from 1999 to 2003. Trim levels were S, ST, and Ti—all powered by the 3.0-liter engine. In Europe, Nissan continued to market the A33 as the Nissan Maxima QX with the 2.0 and 3.0 V6 engines, producing 140 and 200 PS (103 and 147 kW) respectively. In most Southeast Asian countries, the A33 was manufactured until 2008 as the 3.0 Brougham VIP and Excimo 2.0 G under license by Edaran Tan Chong Motor Sdn Bhd in Kuala Lumpur, Malaysia. In Taiwan, the A33 version was manufactured by Yulon and marketed as the Cefiro, the last Nissan Cefiro manufactured by Yulon. In Iran, Pars Khodro manufactured the A33 under license from 2002 to 2012, under the Maxima nameplate. In Indonesia, versions were marketed from 2000 to 2002 as the Infiniti I30 Standard and Touring. Later models from 2002 to 2003 was marketed as Nissan Cefiro 3.0 Brougham VIP.

=== North America ===
==== Infiniti I30 (A33, 1998–2001) ====
Infiniti based the 2000 model year I30 on the A33 Cefiro. Engine power increased to 227 hp (169 kW) and the manual transmission was no longer offered in North America (it remained available in the Middle East). Compared to the similar Nissan Maxima, the I30 included a more powerful engine with a variable-capacity muffler and an additional fenderwell air intake, different front and rear body styling, gauge cluster design, a foot-pedal parking brake (as compared to the Maxima's center console mounted lever), center dashboard design, the availability of a rear sunshade, and standard drivers seat memory. The I30t ("touring"), equipped included High-Intensity Discharge (HID) xenon headlamps with darker colored headlamp surrounds, a viscous limited-slip differential, larger 17-inch wheels, and the availability of a Sport Package which consisted of a rear decklid-mounted spoiler and side-sill body extensions. The rear spoiler was offered as a dealer accessory on the non-Touring I30.

==== Gallery ====
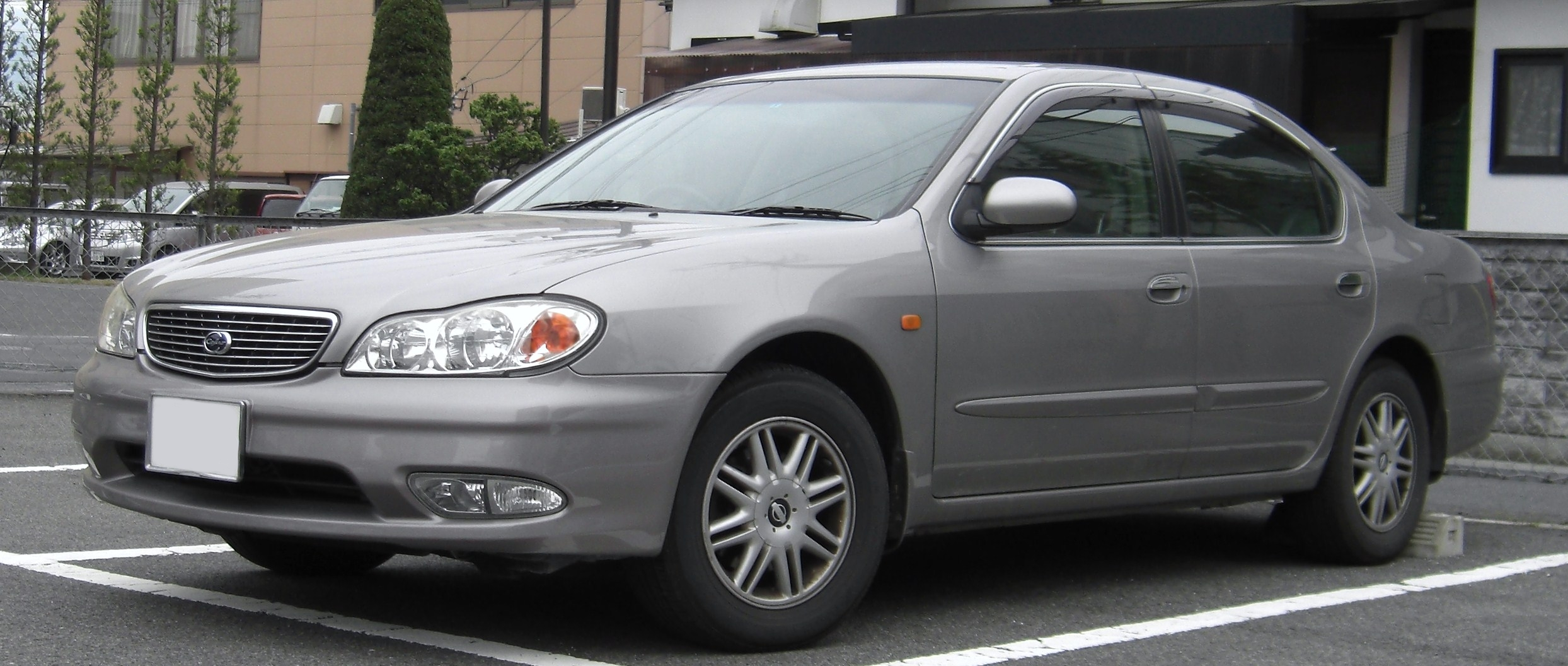
1998–2001 Nissan Cefiro 2.5 Excimo, Japan

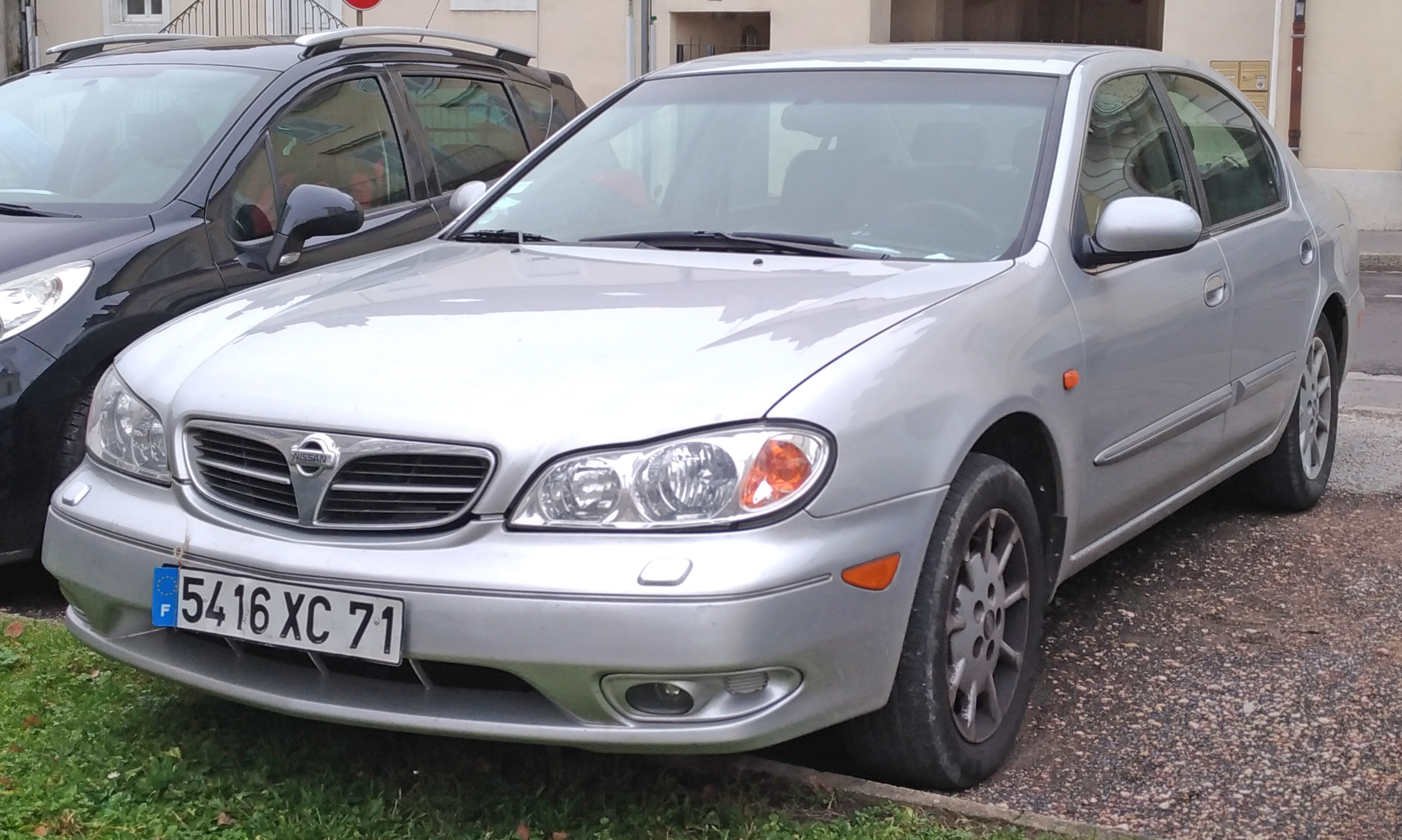
Nissan Maxima QX, Europe

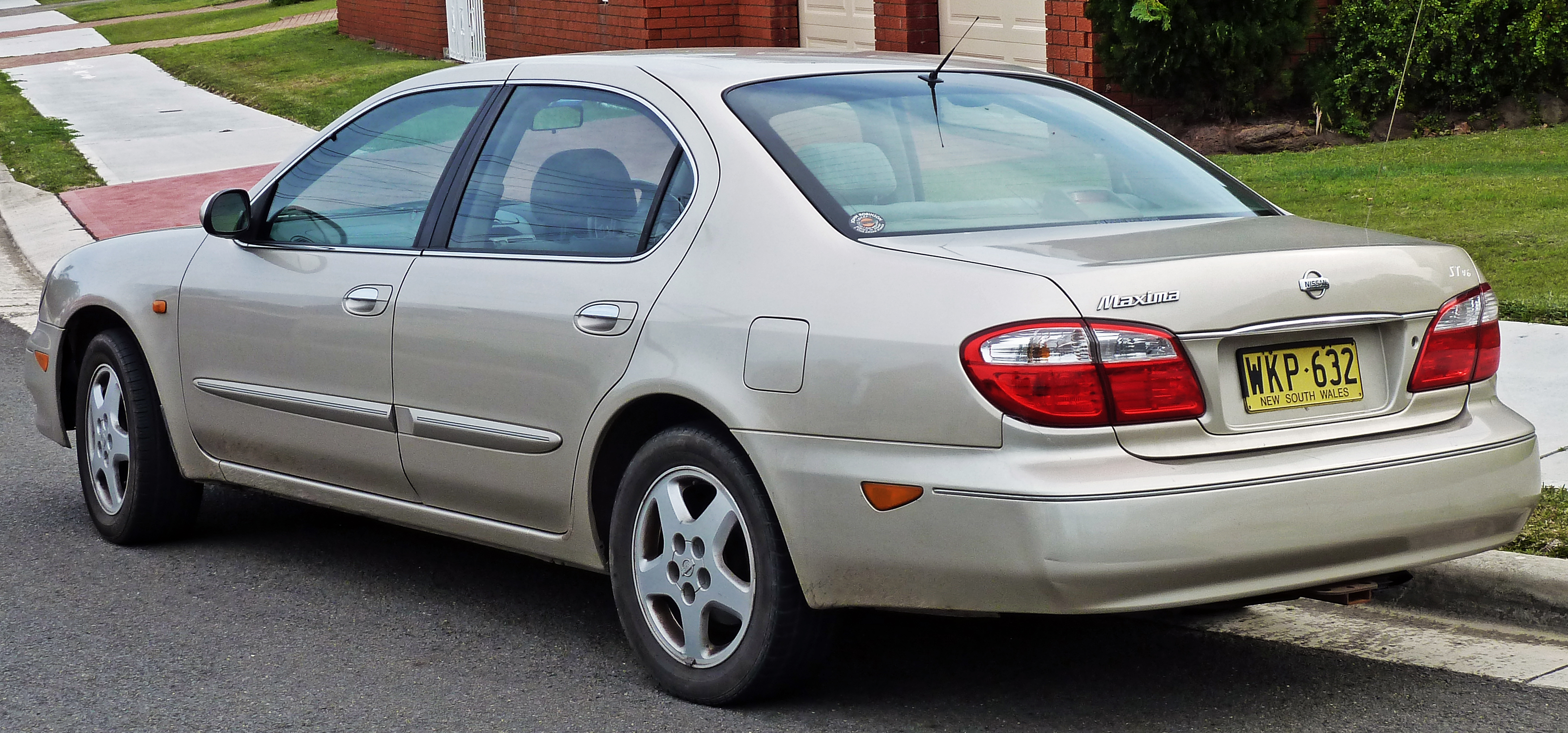
1999–2001 Nissan Maxima ST, Australia

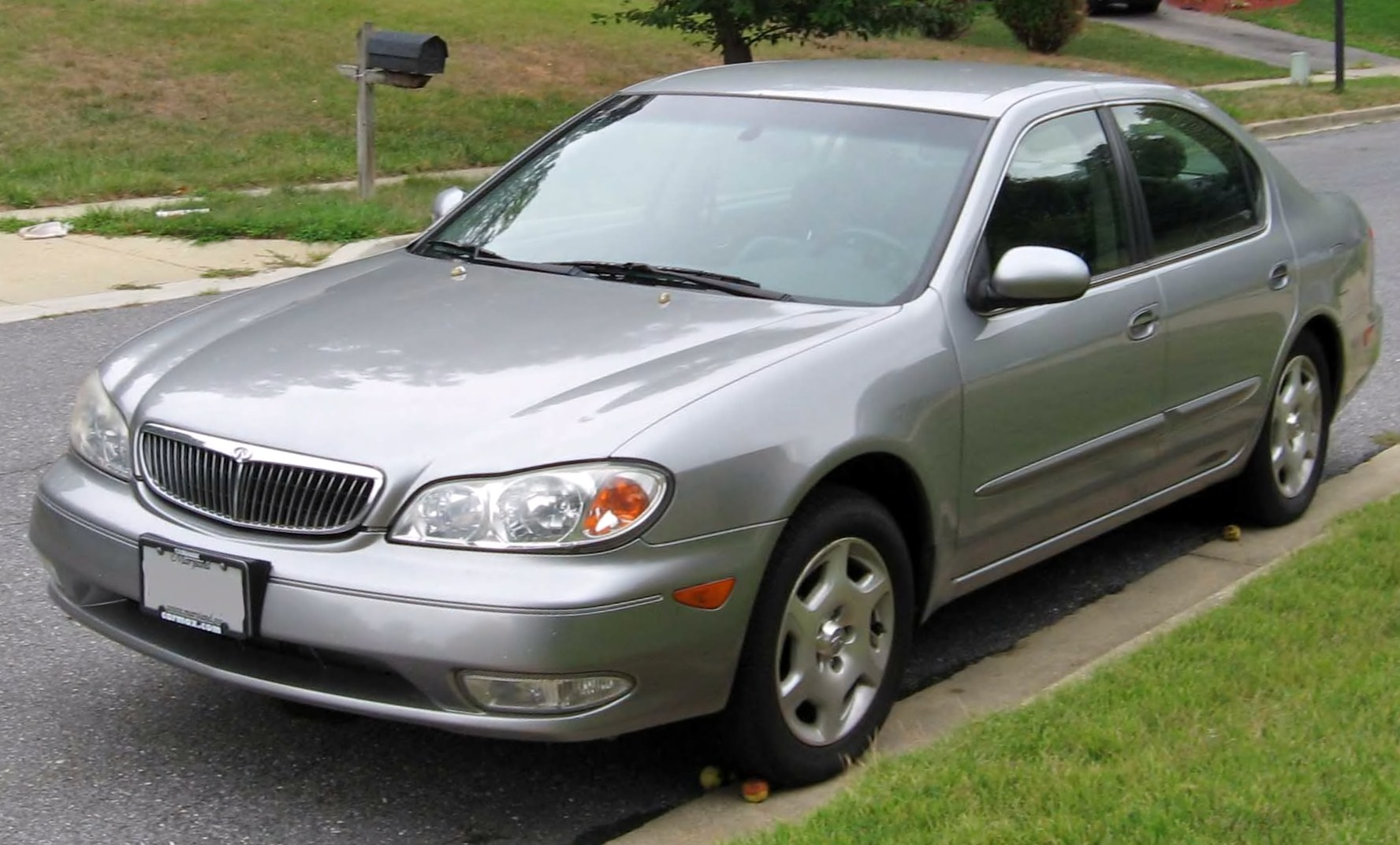
2000–2001 model year Infiniti I30

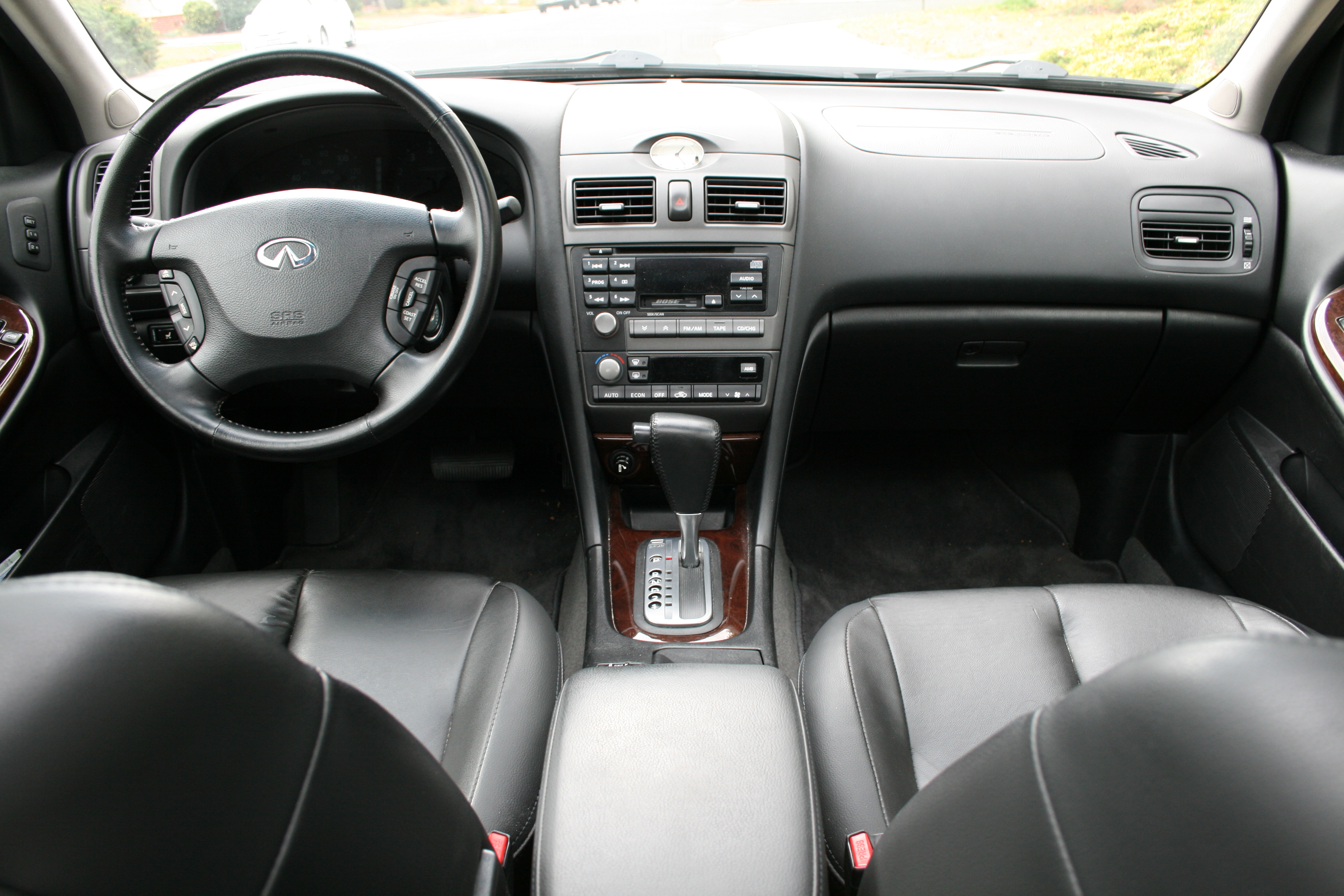
Interior of a 2001 Infiniti I30

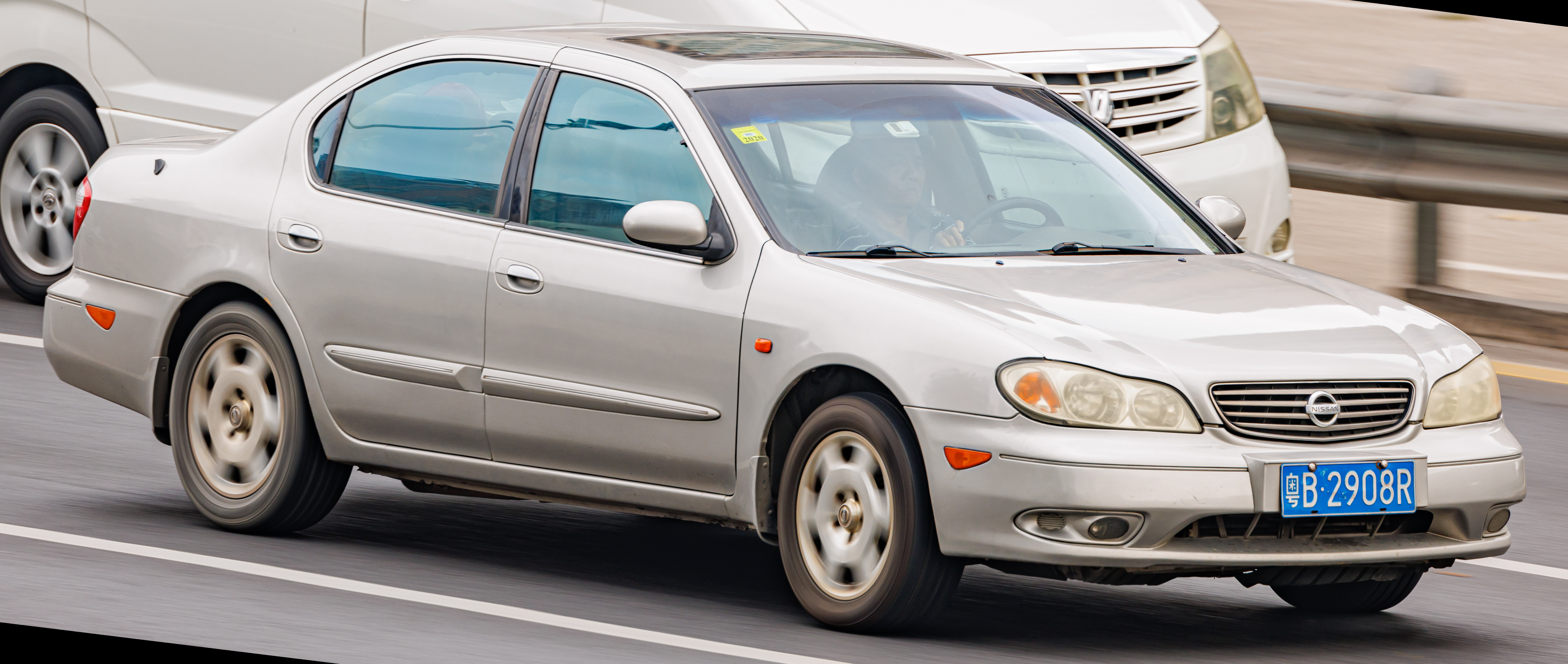
2001–2004 Nissan Cefiro, China

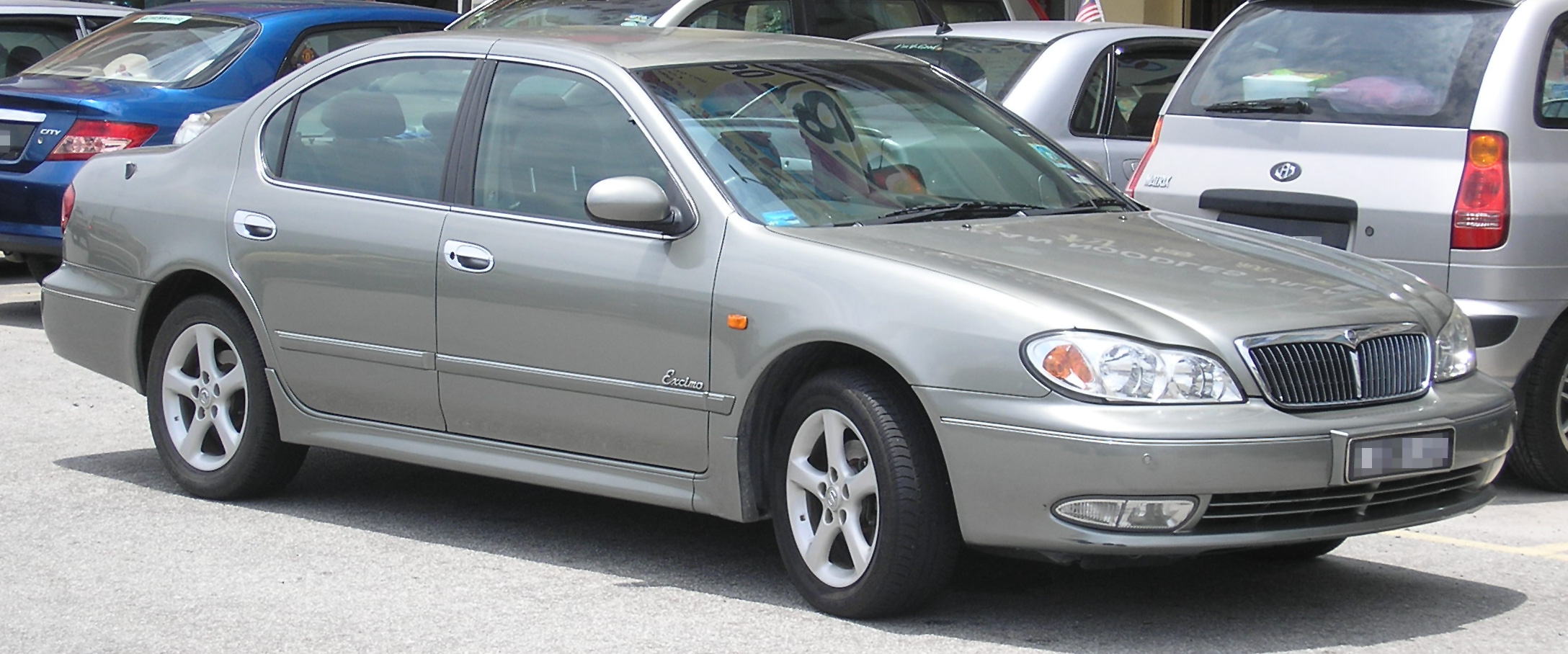
2002–2004 Nissan Cefiro 20G, Southeast Asia

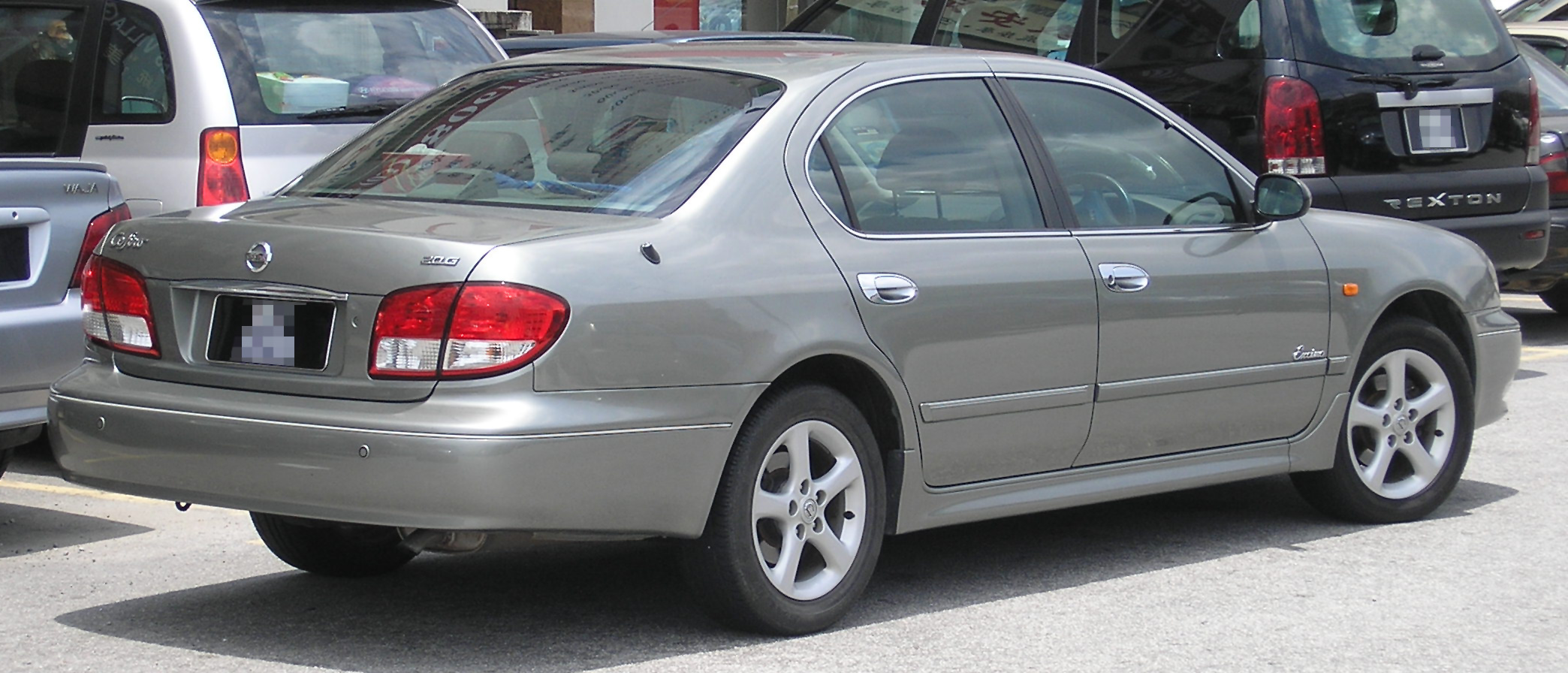
2002–2004 Nissan Cefiro 20G, Southeast Asia

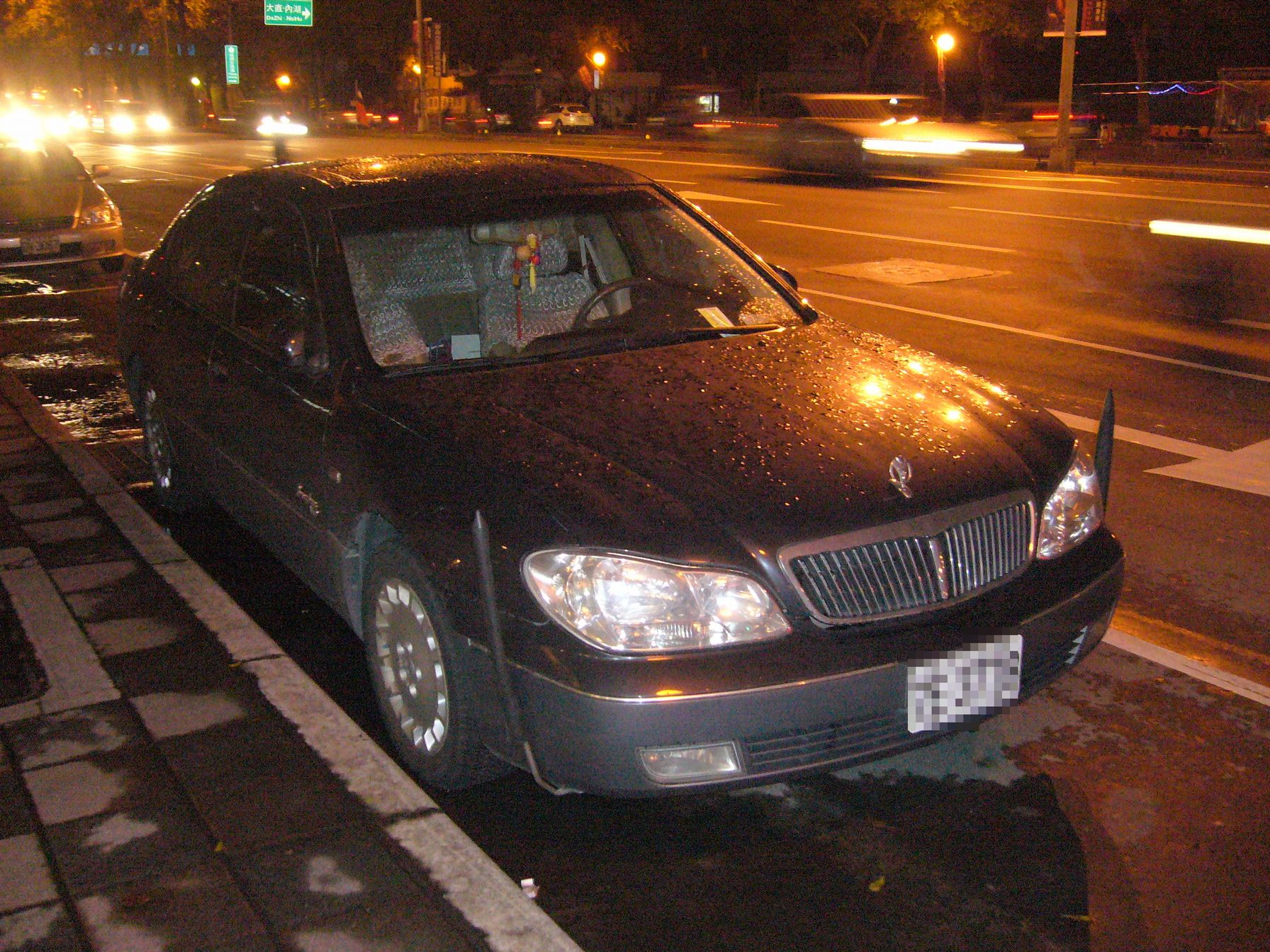
2002–2004 Nissan Cefiro, Taiwan

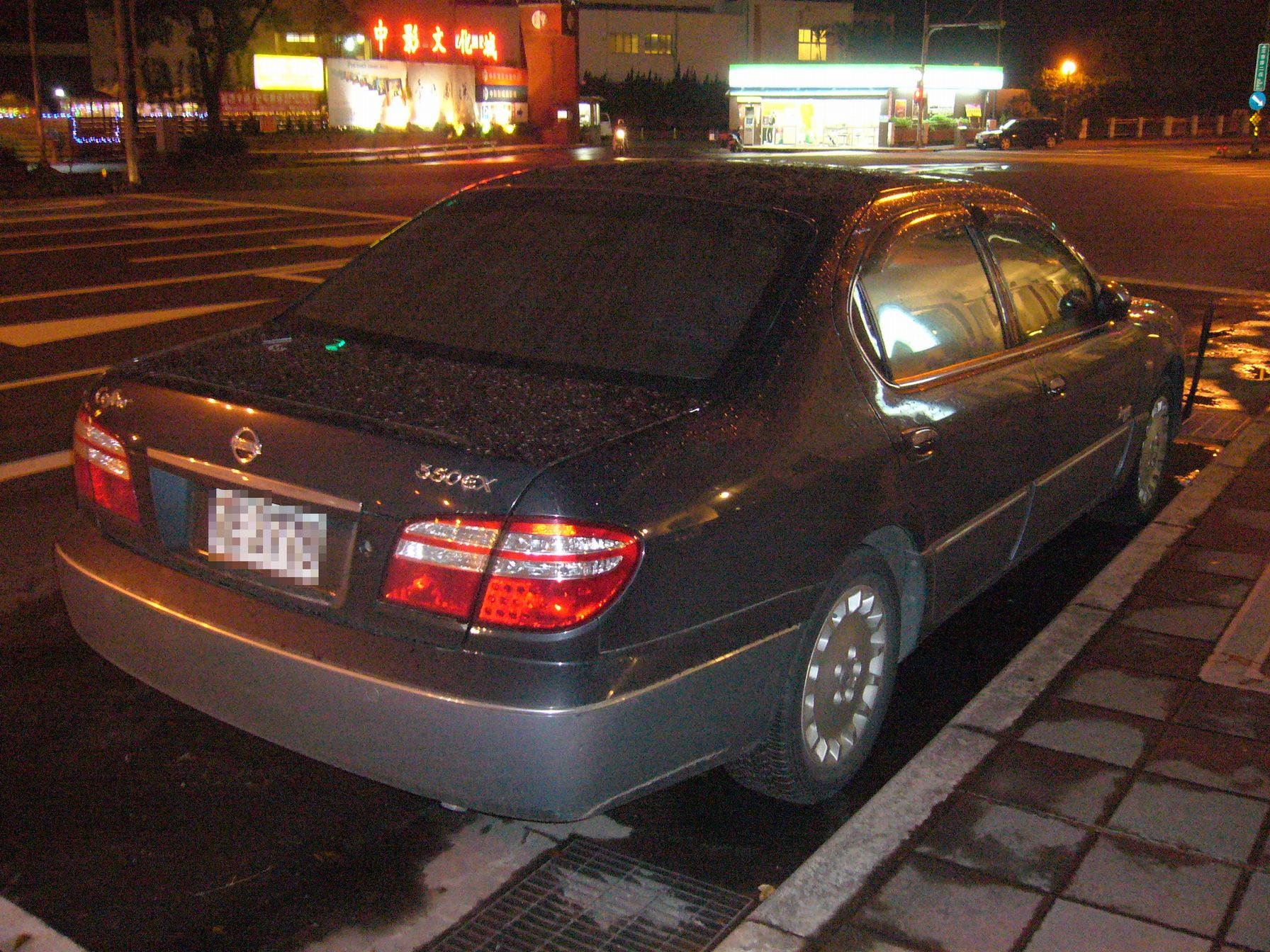
2002–2004 Nissan Cefiro, Taiwan

==== Infiniti I35 (A33, 2002–2004) ====
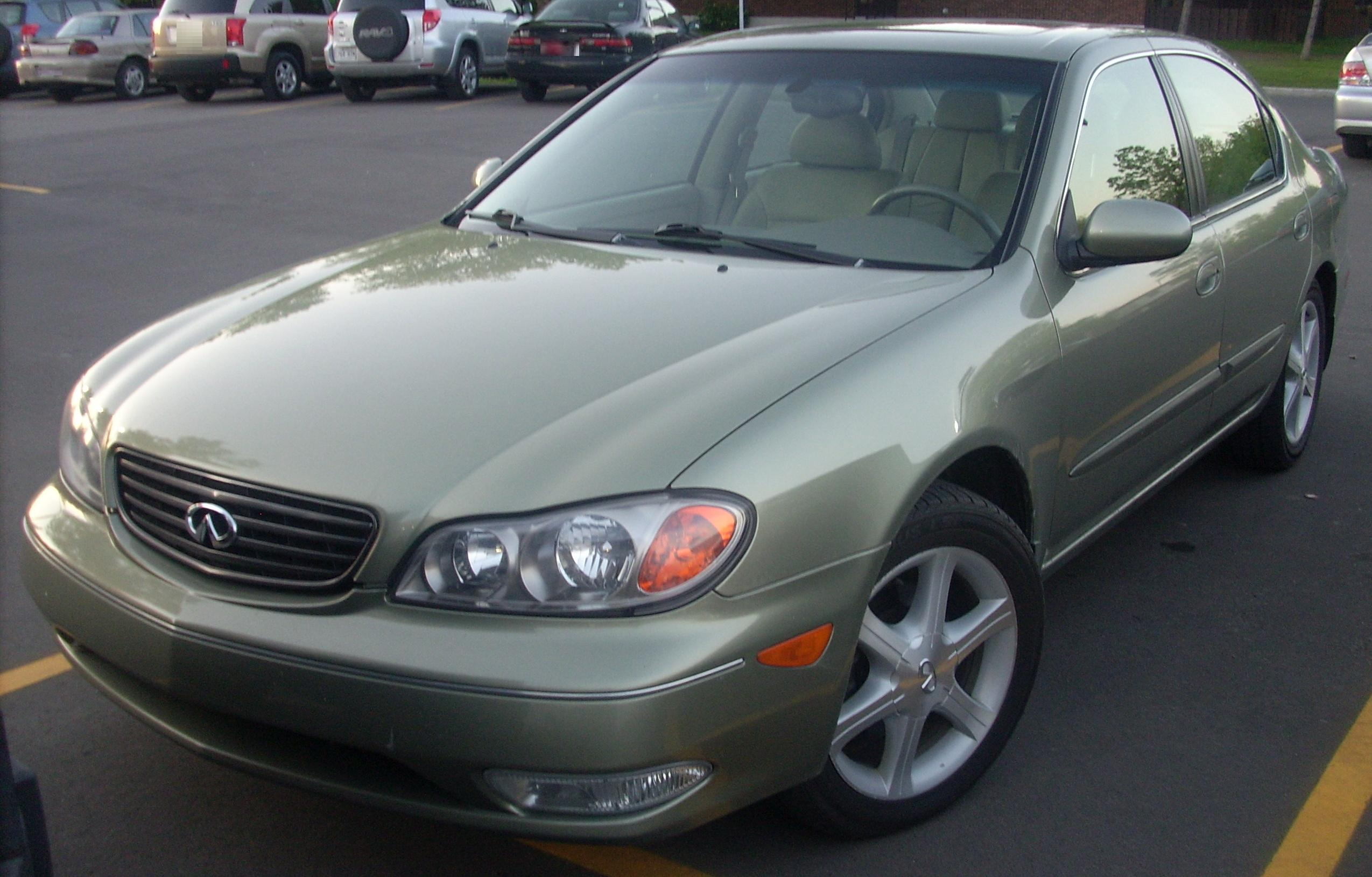
Infiniti I35 (A33)

Nissan updated the I30 for 2002 as the I35 (A33) for its Infiniti luxury division, launching the model with an estimated $40 million advertising campaign beginning in September 2001. Sales began on September 12, 2001 at 150 retailers across the United States, continuing its role as a badge engineered Cefiro positioned above another Cefiro variant, the North American Maxima (A33B).

The I35 nameplate reflected the new engine, a 3.5 liter VQ35DE V6, producing 255 hp (190 kW) and teamed with a four-speed automatic transmission. Other revisions from its predecessor included the painted (rather than chromed) door handles, horizontal front grille, high-intensity xenon headlights, standard fog lights, revised trunk lid, combination lamps, larger badging, and low-restriction exhaust with chrome finishers. With the I35, standard tires increased from 16" to 17", and the turning radius increased from 35.4 to 40.0 feet.

The exterior and interior were designed at the Nissan Technical Center (NTC) in Atsugi, Japan. The I35 featured a coefficient of drag of .31 (.30 where equipped with a rear spoiler), an interior passenger volume of 120 cubic feet, and a 62/38 front/rear weight bias. Manufacture continued at Nissan's Oppama Plant.

===== Mechanical =====
The modular VQ engine design featured continuous valve timing control, a variable induction system, a silent timing chain, an electronically controlled throttle, micro-finished crank journals and cam lobes, molybdenum-coated lightweight pistons, a resin intake collector, digital knock control, six individual coils (one per spark plug), a cross-flow coolant pattern, electronically controlled fluid mounts, and double platinum-tipped spark plugs.

The I35 featured MacPherson strut and coil spring front suspension, a multi-link beam rear suspension with a Scott Russell linkage, front and rear stabilizer bars, and speed-sensitive power rack-and-pinion steering. The Sport option included a system marketed as Vehicle Dynamic Control (VDC) which made engine changes and deployed a brake to inhibit sliding behavior. Specifications included 4-wheel anti-lock brakes, electronic brake force distribution, brake assist, 4-speed electronically controlled automatic transmission; and an electronic traction control system, and engine-speed-sensitive power-assisted rack-and-pinion steering, now with a 40' turning radius.

===== Equipment =====
Interior features included leather-appointed seats (marketed as Sojourner premium leather, at least in one instance reportedly developed in Florence, Italy) with seatback embroidered Infiniti logo (2003-2004); simulated birdseye maple accents on the center console (expanded to include vertical ashtray and surround 2003-2004) and leather-wrapped tilt steering wheel, eight-way power-adjustable driver seat with manual lumbar support; driver's seat automatic entry/exit system that moves the seat fore/aft on entry/exit; 14.9 cubic feet trunk capacity; trunk-mounted first aid kit and emergency inside trunk-release; temporary spare tire; automatic temperature control system, driver's two position seat memory with entry/exit assist system, analog clock, HVAC microfilter ventilation system with reusable, washable filter, titanium-color accented gated shifter with simulated birdseye maple gearshift knob, front seatback pockets, electro-luminescent instrument cluster with multi-function trip computer, universal transceiver with rolling code feature, cruise control with steering wheel-mounted controls, automatic anti-glare rear view mirror with compass; stainless steel sill plates and an optional navigation system with dash-mounted power flip-up monitor.

Standard equipment also included a Bose 200-watt, 7-speaker premium audio system with AM/FM in-dash 6-disc CD changer, steering wheel audio controls, speed-sensitive volume control, radio RDS function and dual in-glass diversity antennas; power-operated rear sunshade, 8-way power driver's seat and 4-way power passenger's seat; High Intensity Discharge (HID) xenon headlights, body-color outside door handles; electromagnetic trunk and fuel door release, remote keyless entry with fob-operated front window auto-down and key operated up/down; retained accessory power; automatic anti-glare rearview mirror with integrated digital compass, and lockable split- folding rear seats.

Options groups included the Sunroof and Sunshade Package with moonroof (with variable control switch in place of a rocker-type switch) and rear power sunshade (optional 2002-2003, standard equipment 2004); Cold Weather Package with heated front (and rear, Canada) seats, leather-wrapped heated steering wheel (with deleted simulated maple accents) and heated outside mirrors with timer; and Sport Package with 8-spoke champagne-tinted 17-inch aluminum-alloy wheels and P225/50R17 V-rated tires, Vehicle Dynamic Control, sport-tuned suspension and side sill extensions. Canadian I35 content varied, including as standard equipment a heated steering wheel and heated rear seats.

Individual options included 8-spoke chrome-finished 17-inch aluminum-alloy wheels; navigation system with power-retractable color LCD screen, trunk-mounted 6-disc CD autochanger; side sill extensions: side rocker sill moldings, rear spoiler and a full-size spare tire with aluminum-alloy wheel (reducing available cargo room).

Exterior colors included Brilliant Silver (silver, 2002–2004), Ivory Pearl (white, 2002–2004), Golden Sand (light gold, 2002–2004), Black Obsidian (black, 2002-2004), Midnight Blue (dark metallic blue, 2002–2004), Millennium Jade (light metallic green, 2002–2003), Royal Ruby (dark maroon, 2002), Autumn Bronze (brown, 2002–2004), Diamond Graphite (dark gray metallic, 2003–2004), Desert Platinum metallic (medium gold, 2004). Interior "Sojourner" leather was available three color themes: marketed as Willow [gray], Graphite [black] and Beige [beige].

===== Advertising =====
The I35 was introduced with an ad campaign featuring print, radio, newspaper, direct mail, internet ads as well as a television commercial by TBWA\Chiat\Day titled Hummingbird. The ad depicted an I35 driving in the background along a country road with a hummingbird in the foreground. The car and hummingbird moved at full speed, the bird's wings blurred. The action then slowed, the voice of actress Natasha Richardson advised the viewer 'not to blink' — and the action returned to full-speed. The ad closed with the tagline, "More Power, More Grace, More I... the new I35, from Infiniti."

== Later use of the Cefiro nameplate (J31, 2003) ==
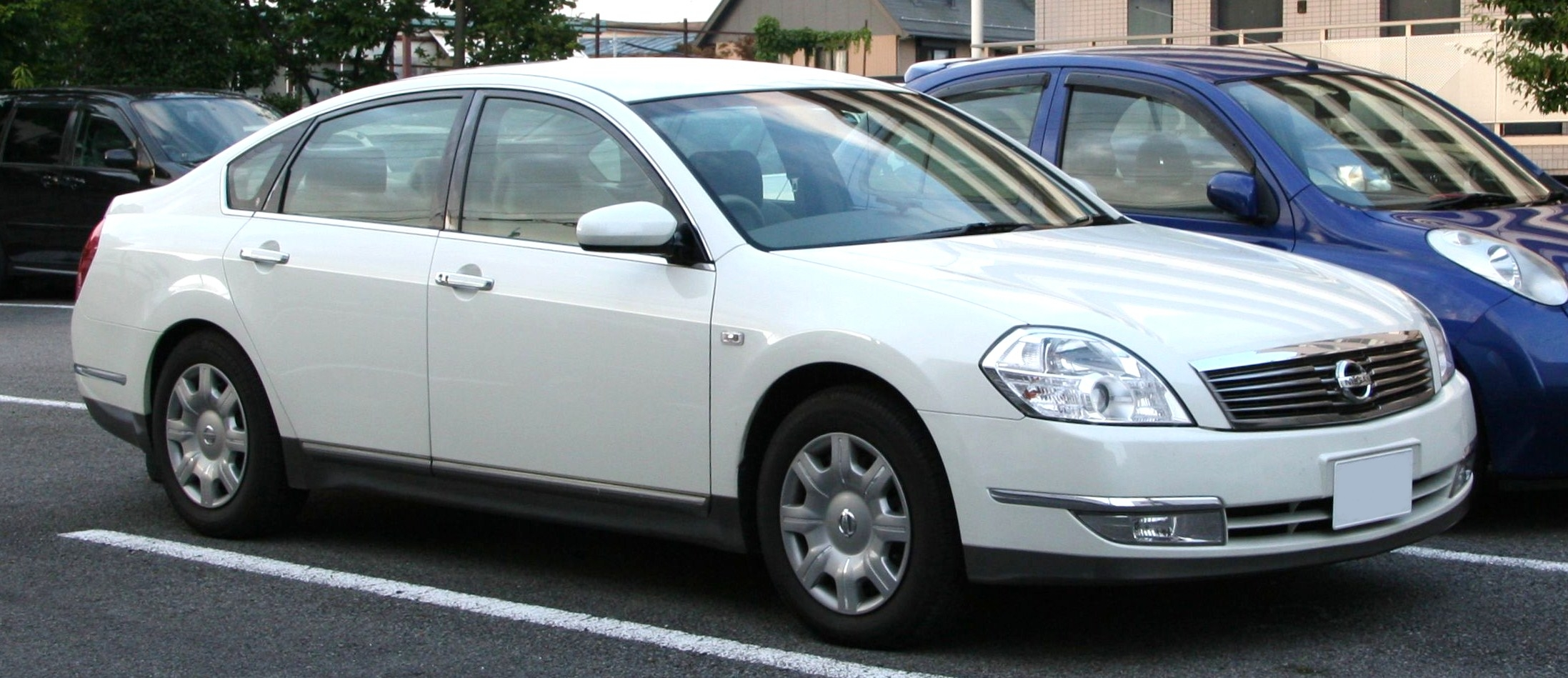
Nissan Teana (J31), sold as the "Cefiro" in some Asian markets

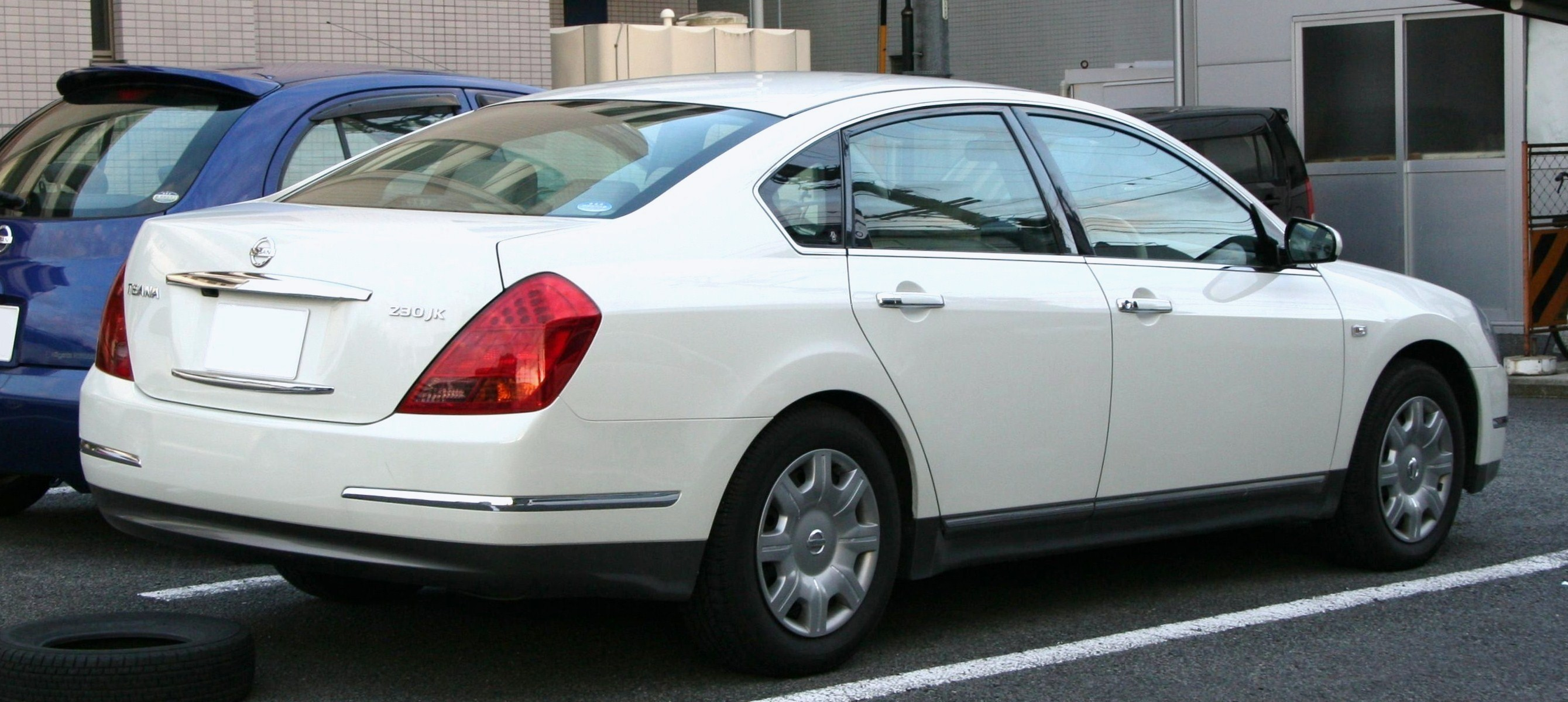
Nissan Teana (J31), sold as the "Cefiro" in some Asian markets

Nissan discontinued the Cefiro in 2003, later using the nameplate on the Nissan Teana (J31), exported to Hong Kong, Nepal, Bangladesh, Singapore, Brunei, Latin America and the Caribbean. Ghandhara Nissan in Karachi, Pakistan, was the last plant using the Cefiro name when it was replaced by the Nissan Teana J32 in late 2012.
