= List of magazines in Malaysia =

The following is an incomplete list of current and defunct magazines published in Malaysia. They may be published in Malay or in other languages, including English and Chinese.

Women's magazine, comic magazines, film magazines and others are common in Malaysia. The first women's magazine was published in Malaysia in 1932. In the 2000s there were nearly fifty local titles addressing women in the country. These magazines also include those having an Islamic perspective. Some international women's magazines are also published in Malaysia. One of them is Elle Malaysia, which was first published in March 2014. Another one, Women’s Health, was started in April 2015.

== A ==
- Al Islam
- Aliran Monthly
- Anjung Seri
- Asuh
- Aswaq
- Aulad

== B ==
- Bandwidth Street Press
- Bicara

== C ==
- Cittá Bella
- Commercial Concept

== D ==
- Dapur Impiana
- Dara.com
- Designer Concept
- Dewan Pelajar
- Dewan Sastera
- Dewan Siswa

== E ==
- EH!
- Elle Malaysia

== G ==
- Gado Gado
- Galaxie
- Gempak Starz
- Gila-Gila
- Glam
- Glam Deko
- Glam Lelaki
- Grazia Malaysia
- Gusti

== F ==
- female
- F1RST

== H ==
- Hai
- Harmoni
- Hijabista
- hot magazine
- Hype

== I ==
- I
- Ibubapa
- Icon
- Impiana
- Infiniti
- Intisari Magazine
- InTrend

== J ==
- Jelita
- Jutawan

== K ==
- Keluarga
- Kino
- Klik
- KLUE
- Komik Manga Naruto
- Kreko Magazine
- Kuntum

== L ==
- Laman Impiana
- L'Officiel Malaysia
- L'Officiel Hommes Malaysia

== M ==
- Madam Chair
- Malaysia Insider
- Mangga
- Massa
- Mastika
- Maskulin
- Med
- Media Hiburan
- Metropolitan Home
- Midi
- Milenia
- Mingguan Sukan
- Mingguan Wanita
- Misteri
- Motor Trader Magazine
- Musotrees

== N ==
- Nona
- Nur
- Nüyou

== P ==
- Pa&Ma
- Pancing
- PC
- Perajurit
- The Peak
- Pesona Pengantin
- Pesta

== R ==
- Rapi
- Rasa
- Remaja
- The Rocket
- Roda-Roda
- ROTTW

== S ==
- Saji
- Santai
- Solusi
- Suasana Bintang Filem
- Sukses
- Suri

== T ==
- Third World Resurgence
- Tatler Malaysia
- Tatler Homes
- Teleskop
- Tempur
- Tunas Cipta

== U ==
- Ummi
- Umpan
- URTV
- Utopia
- Utusan Konsumer

== V ==
- Variapop
- Variasari

== W ==
- Wanita
- Wisel!
- WM

== International Titles ==
- CLEO Malaysia
- Cosmopolitan Malaysia
- Elle Malaysia
- FHM Malaysia
- Harper's Bazaar Malaysia
- Her World Malaysia
- Home & Decor Malaysia
- LIME Malaysia
- L'Officiel Malaysia
- Marie Claire Malaysia
- Men's Folio Malaysia
- Men's Health Malaysia
- Men's Uno Malaysia
- Sedap Malaysia
- Seventeen Malaysia
- Shape Malaysia
- The Peak Malaysia
- TimeOutKL
- Women's Health Malaysia

== See also ==
- List of newspapers in Malaysia
