= Tone (magazine) =

- Tone magazine logo
- Editor: Gary Steel
- Former editors: Greg Vincent, Matt Greenop, Ted Gibbons
- Categories: technology
- Frequency: Bi-monthly
- Circulation: 5647 (2008) (within NZ)
- Publisher: Parkside Media
- First issue: October 1999
- Final issue: December 2011
- Company: Parkside Media
- Country: New Zealand
- Language: English
- Website: Formerly www.tone.co.nz, no longer valid.
- ISSN: 1175-2459

Tone was a bi-monthly magazine combining coverage of technological developments in New Zealand and from around the world with reviews on the latest consumer products available in New Zealand.

== History and profile ==
It was Parkside Media's third magazine, following NZ Classic Car and NZ Performance Car. Tone was started in 1999. Until issue 32, the magazine was bi-monthly. A change was made to monthly, but as of issue 73 (November/December 2008), it returned to bi-monthly.

Tone's offices were in Grey Lynn, Auckland, New Zealand. The magazine ceased publication in December 2011.

== Masthead design ==
Tone's logo featured a small coloured triangle. Internally this was called 'Jerry'. Jerry changes colour each issue to match the cover design. Version 2 of the logo appeared in issue 32 when the magazine changed to monthly. Version 3 of the logo appeared in issue 44. Version 4 of the logo appeared in issue 67 and changed the tagline to Gadgets | Hi-fi | Home theatre, from Technology to change your life.

== Magazine contents ==
As of the November/December 2008 issue, the typical magazine contents included:

- News
- Toneworld (short product overviews)
- Reviews (detailed product tests)
- Entertainment (CD, DVD, game reviews)
- Readers' letters
- Contributor columns
- Feature stories (event reviews, technical tips and tricks, how-to articles, company overviews)
