= NZ Performance Car TV =

- The NZ Performance Car TV logo
- Created by: Greg Vincent, Graham Ralphs, Darren Cottingham, Michael White
- Starring: Dan Gibson, Craig 'Puka' Linn
- Country of origin: New Zealand
- Original language: English
- No. of seasons: 8
- No. of episodes: >100

Production
- Producer: Iain Eggleton
- Production locations: New Zealand, Australia
- Running time: 30 minutes

Original release
- Network: Various since inception: TV ONE, TV2, TV3, Sky Sport 1-3, Prime TV
- Release: 2004

NZ Performance Car TV is a free-to-air television program that ran for eight series, produced in-house by Parkside Media. It has had airtime on TV ONE, TV2, TV3, Prime TV and Sky Sport 1-3, often with several networks simultaneously which was unique in its genre. Each series consisted of 13 episodes. Two series were screened per year. It was also available via TVNZ ondemand.

== History ==
First airing in 2004, the series evolved to match the changing tastes of the import car scene. Series 8 had a large focus on drifting.

The show builds on the NZ Performance Car magazine brand, featuring similar content.

== Show content ==
Original TV logo for seasons 1-4 when Pioneer was the sponsor.

- Drifting
- Drag racing
- Import car culture
- Event coverage
- Driver interviews
- Modified car features
- Tech and tuning tips
- Competitions

The show's content reflects the seasonal nature of the scene in New Zealand. Series filmed in winter tend to feature more modified cars and less motorsport; series filmed in summer feature more motorsport and less modified cars.

== Series overview ==
Series	Episodes	Originally released		
Series	Episodes	First released	Last released	Network
1	6	23 September 2004	28 October 2004	Sky Sport 1
2	TBA	2 April 2005	2005	Prime TV
3	TBA	17 September 2005	2005	Prime TV
4	TBA	16 April 2006	2006	TV3
5	14	23 May 2007	22 August 2007	TV 2
6	TBA	2008	TBA	Sky Sport 1
7	TBA	2008	TBA	Sky Sport 1

The series has endured much criticism because of its niche nature, including presenters and their ties to the scene, content choice and timeslots (each series had a different timeslot and sometimes a different channel or network).

=== Series 1 ===
Presented by Anna Jobsz and Danny Codling

=== Series 2 ===
Presented by Todd Wylie and Dan Philips

=== Series 3 ===
Frank Liew, noted Auto Salon judge with deep involvement in the import car scene, presented series 3.

=== Series 4 ===
Frank Liew returned to present series 4

=== Series 5 ===
Series 5 featured well-known TV presenter Brooke Howard-Smith. As Howard-Smith is a TV3 presenter, when NZ Performance Car TV moved to TVNZ for Series 6, he was replaced.

=== Series 6 ===
Series 6 featured Geoffrey Bell as the main presenter.

=== Series 7 ===
Series 7 featured Geoffrey Bell as the main presenter.

=== Series 8 ===
Series 8 saw a return to a regular timeslot within Sunday afternoon's Powerbuilt Tools Motorsport on TV ONE, with a longer more adult-themed show which aired late night on TV2. Presenters Dan Gibson and Craig ‘Puka’ Linn.

== Controversy ==
NZ Performance Car TV, like NZ Performance Car magazine has typically been criticised by groups not in favour of import car culture, or those concerned about ‘boy racer’ activity.

Series 8 focused much more on motorsport, covering the NZ Drift Series in New Zealand, drifting overseas, drag racing in New Zealand and Australia (e.g. Jamboree 18 from Willowbank Raceway and Super Lap from Taupo Motorsport Park), including interviews with and profiles of drivers such as Daniel Woolhouse and Carl Ruiterman. Feature cars and other event coverage were still present, but the increased focus on motorsport marked a divergence from NZ Performance Car magazine content.

== Production and crew ==
Series 1-4 were produced and directed by Graham Ralphs. Series 5 onwards were produced by Iain Eggleton
