= Red Bull Drifting World Championship =

The Red Bull Drifting World Championship is a non-championship all-star drifting contest sponsored by Red Bull energy drink and hosted by IMG and Slipstream Global Marketing, the organizers behind Formula D. The event took place at the Port of Long Beach in Long Beach, California on November 15–16, 2008.

Announced prior to the Las Vegas Formula D round on July 14, at $50,000, it boasts of the largest prize money in a drifting contest and the largest TV production for a drift contest.

The inaugural event was won by Rhys Millen, incidentally sponsored by Red Bull, taking home $25,000.

== Criteria for eligibility ==
As there are 32 places for the event, drivers from all over the world are given a place should they meet these following criteria:

- Finish at the Top 16 in the Formula D points table
- Become the championship winner at these following oversea drifting events listed below, should that not happen, they are eligible to take up any available runner up spot should it be offered to them.
  - D1NZ (New Zealand)
  - Drift Mania Canadian Championship (Canada)
  - Drift Australia (Australia)
  - European Drift Championship (United Kingdom)
  - International Drift Series (Germany)
  - Pro Drift European Series (Ireland)
  - Nordic Drifting Championship (Scandinavia)
  - D1 Grand Prix (Japan)
  - NZ Drift Series (New Zealand)
- Have been D1GP title holder in the past years
- Have won the exhibition Formula D Singapore event

== Venue ==
Taking place on 90-acre (360,000 m^{2}) lot of newly laided up asphalt on Port of Long Beach, in a course known as "Pier S".

The entire venue had to be built from scratch, however temporary. Altogether, the venue in all, accounting for three grandstands, borrowed from those of the Long Beach Grand Prix and the 2,000 seating for VIP and sponsor are designed to accommodate up to 25,000 spectators.

The course length is 1,200 ft (370 m), with another 100 ft (30 m) to allow for a rolling start with six corners outlined by a Red Bull sign. Drivers who had driven on the track are said to be capable of reaching 104 mph (167 km/h) during test runs.

== List of invited drivers ==
Driver	Team/Principal sponsor	Car/Engine	Series	Season Position	Number
Tanner Foust (United States)	Rockstar/ AEM	Nissan 350Z	Formula D	2007 & 2008 Champion	34
Samuel Hubinette (Sweden)	Nuformz Mopar/BFG	Dodge Viper SRT-10	Formula D	2004 & 2006 Champion	77
Rhys Millen (New Zealand) (United States)	RMR Red Bull Pontiac	Pontiac Solstice GXP	Formula D	2005 Champion	6
Daijiro Yoshihara (Japan)	RMR	Pontiac GTO	Formula D	4th	9
Chris Forsberg (United States)	NOS Energy Drink Drift Team	Nissan 350Z-VK56DE V8	Formula D	5th	64
Michihiro Takatori (Japan)	Super Autobacs	Nissan Skyline GT-R R34	Formula D	7th	23
Conrad Grunewald (United States)	Tanaka Racing/Nitto Tires	Chevrolet Corvette C5	Formula D	8th	79
Robbie Nishida (Japan) (United States)	Hankook	Nissan 350Z	Formula D	9th	31
Vaughn Gittin, Jr. (United States)	Team Falken Tire-Drift Alliance	Ford Mustang GT "5th Gen"	Formula D	10th	
Ryuji Miki (Japan)	A'PEXi-Bergenholtz Racing	Mazda RX-7 FD3S	Formula D	11th 2004 D1GP Champion	
Darren McNamara (Republic of Ireland)	Sears/Falken Tires	Saturn Sky V8	Formula D	12th 2008 Prodrift Runner-up	
Stephan Verdier (France)	Crawford Motorsports	Subaru Impreza WRX STI GD	Formula D	13th	
Ken Gushi (Japan) (United States)	RS*R Scion	Scion tC	Formula D	14th	
Bill Sherman (United States)	Retaks/Bridgestone	Nissan 240SX S13	Formula D	15th	
Justin Pawlak (United States)	Drift Alliance	Mazda RX-7 FC3S	Formula D	16th	
Kyle Mohan (United States)		Mazda RX-7 FC3S	Formula D	17th	
Garry Whiter (New Zealand)	Toyo Tires	Nissan Silvia S14.5	D1NZ	Champion	
Carl Ruiterman (New Zealand)	E&H Motors	Nissan Silvia S14	NZ Drift	Champion	16
Freddy Girrard (Canada)	Hankook	Nissan Skyline R32	DMCC	Champion	
Marcos Santos (Canada)			DMCC	Runners-up	
Leighton Fine (Australia)	Toyo Tires	Nissan 240SXS14	Drift Australia	2008 Champion	
Luke Fink (Australia)	Holford Motors	Nissan 180SX	Drift Australia	2008 Runners-up	
Robbie Bolger (Australia)		Nissan 180SX	Drift Australia	2007 Champion	
Ben Broke-Smith (United Kingdom)	Driftworks	Toyota Chaser	EDC	Champion	24
Tim Marshall (United Kingdom)	Apex Performance	Nissan Skyline R33/SB Chevy V8	EDC	2nd	118
Tengku Djan Ley (Malaysia)	Bridgestone	Nissan 180SXS13.5	FD Singapore	Champion	
Mike Whiddett (New Zealand)	Red Bull	Mazda RX-7 FD3S 4Rotor	FD Singapore	2nd	15
James Deane (Republic of Ireland)	Nexen	Nissan 200SX S14.5 RB26	ProDrift	Champion	
Eric O’Sullivan (Republic of Ireland)	Rockstar	Toyota Corolla Coupe AE86 F20	ProDrift	2nd	
Fredric Aasbø (Norway)	Japan Auto	Toyota Supra	NDC	Champion	
Remmo Niezen (Netherlands)		BMW M3 E30 V8	IDS	Champion	
Paul Vlasblom (Netherlands)	Driftking.NL	BMW M3 E36 Touring	IDS		
Katsuhiro Ueo (Japan)	Drift Speed	Nissan Silvia S15	D1GP	2002 Champion	86
drivers who been invited but declined entries
Ryan Tuerck (United States)	Gardella Racing	Pontiac Solstice GXP	Formula D	6th	
Nobuteru Taniguchi (Japan)	HKS	Toyota Altezza	D1GP	2001 Champion	
Youichi Imamura (Japan)	Auto Produce Boss	Nissan Silvia S15	D1GP	2003 Champion	
Yasuyuki Kazama (Japan)			D1GP	2005 Champion	
Nobushige Kumakubo (Japan)	Team Orange	Mitsubishi Lancer Evo IX	D1GP	2006 Champion	
Masato Kawabata (Japan)	Team Toyo	Nissan 180SX	D1GP	2007 Champion	
Daigo Saito (Japan)	Team 22	Toyota Mark II JZX 100	D1GP	2008 Champion	
Manabu Orido (Japan)			MSC Challenge	Series judge	

With the exception of Formula D, each series are allocated two entries, including D1GP, who following negotiation, were given six invites

When negotiation broke down, D1 drivers were discouraged from taking invites, therefore they were approached directly by the FD management to find out that they invited entrants, the former D1GP champions in particular, had to decline their entries for the reason of scheduling conflicts. Kumakubo declined his as he was due to take part in a drift demo in Dubai, Kazama, despite no longer involved in the series, declined because of schedule clash.

Former D1GP judge, competitor and Super GT driver, Orido was forced to decline his invitation as he was competing in the WTCC Guia Race at Macau on the same weekend, as was fellow judge and returning competitor Taniguchi, was taking part in a Super Taikyu race in Japan.

Other than that, and 2003 champion, Imamura declined his as he was unable to attend, the 2007 champion Kawabata declined his entry, but it was revealed that "conflict of interest" led them to decline. Saito, who originally accepted his entry, was forced to decline his entry for the same reason, although it was rumored that he placed two cars in a container to make its way to the event. Millen backed this claim of the organisation's bullying tactic during an interview

Only one FD driver, Tuerck, declined for budgetary reason as he is lacking a title sponsor, funding could not stretch for the event, therefore Mohan took his place. Santos, Bolger and Ruiterman made up the rest of the available slot.

== Qualifying ==
Number	Starting order	Driver	Score
6	26	Millen	98.17
77	18	Hubinette	97.00
32	9	Vlasblom	96.83
86	13	Ueo	96.08
8	10	McNamara	95.75
9	28	Yoshihara	94.67
25	6	Gittin	94.50
79	25	Grunewald	93.83
34	5	Foust	93.50
99	21	Mohan	93.08
23	11	Takatori	92.25
64	32	Forsberg	92.08
16	7	Ruiterman	90.33
51	24	Aasbo	90.33
17	19	Deane	86.67
48	17	Djan	86.50
12	23	Verdier	83.92
118	8	Marshall	83.67
69	14	Fink	83.42
11	29	Whiter	82.92
7	31	O’Sullivan	82.92
22	16	Sherman	82.50
14	12	Fine	80.58
20	30	Niezen	79.58
31	3	Nishida	77.83
19	4	Santos	77.25
911	27	Bolger	72.67
24	20	Broke-Smith	72.42
5	1	Gushi	0.00
15	2	Whiddett	0.00
26	15	Miki	0.00
13	22	Pawlak	0.00

== Knockout stage ==
Top 32
(New Zealand) Millen
(United States) Gushi
(Republic of Ireland) O'Sullivan
(France) Verdier
(Japan) Takatori
(United States) Sherman
(United States) Gittin
(Canada) Santos
(Republic of Ireland) McNamara
(United Kingdom) Broke-Smith
(United States) Foust
(Netherlands) Niezen
(New Zealand) Ruiterman
(Australia) Fink
(Netherlands) Vlasblom
(Australia) Whiddet
(Sweden) Hubinette
(Japan) Miki
(Republic of Ireland) Deane
(Malaysia) Tengku
(United States) Forsberg
(New Zealand) Whiter
(United States) Grunewald
(Japan) Nishida
(Japan) Yoshihara
(Australia) Bolger
(United States) Mohan
(Australia) Fine
(Norway) Aasbo
(United Kingdom) Marshall
(Japan) Ueo
(United States) Pawlak

Top 16
(New Zealand) Millen
(France) Verdier
(United States) Sherman
(United States) Gittin
(Republic of Ireland) McNamara
(United States) Foust
(New Zealand) Ruiterman
(Australia) Whiddet
(Sweden) Hubinette
(Malaysia) Tengku
(United States) Forsberg
(Japan) Nishida
(Japan) Yoshihara
(Australia) Fine
(Norway) Aasbo
(Japan) Ueo

Great 8
(New Zealand) Millen
(United States) Gittin
(United States) Foust
(Australia) Whiddet
(Sweden) Hubinette
(United States) Forsberg
(Japan) Yoshihara
(Japan) Ueo

Semi Finals
(New Zealand) Millen
(United States) Foust
(Sweden) Hubinette
(Japan) Yoshihara

Final
(New Zealand) Millen
(Japan) Yoshihara
