= NZV8 (magazine) =

- NZV8 logo
- Editor: Rixsta Sammons
- Categories: Automotive
- Frequency: Bi-monthly
- Publisher: Parkside Media
- First issue: June 2005
- Company: Parkside Media
- Country: New Zealand
- Language: English
- Website: www.v8.co.nz
- ISSN: 1176-5690

NZV8 is a monthly automotive magazine and website that focuses on V8 cars, car clubs and the related culture predominantly in New Zealand, but also Australia and the United States.

The magazine's readership was 96,000 in 2011. It was the third automotive magazine to be published by Parkside Media, the other two being NZ Performance Car and NZ Classic Car. NZV8's offices are in Grey Lynn, Auckland, New Zealand.

== Tagline ==
The magazine's tagline was originally Feel the power. It was changed in issue 32 (January 2008) to NZ's top circuit, strip and street machines.

== Content ==
Issue 42

Issue 1 of NZV8

As of the December 2008 issue (#43), the typical magazine contents include:

- Feature car reviews
- Event overviews (such as drag racing, V8 Supercars, car club meets, etc.)
- New car and car tuner news from around the world
- Driver interviews (for example Andy Booth)
- Editor and contributor columns
- Scale model reviews
- Drag racing records
- Events calendar
- Readers’ letters
- Book reviews

== Website ==
Daily news articles are available weekdays which are additional to magazine content. Full magazine articles are available from previous issues, often including additional photos and information (including videos) that could not be fitted into the magazine. Some writers run blogs on the website, and a forum is run as a subsite to encourage user interaction.

Users can purchase books related to muscle cars, Pony cars, V8s and motorsport, as well as back issues and subscriptions in the online shop.

Online games

Jetsprint Legends is the first game in the world to feature jet boat racing on New Zealand's jet boat tracks.

== Television ==
The inaugural season of NZV8 TV was broadcast in 2009 over 13 weeks as a part of Powerbuilt Tools Motorsport on TV1, Sunday afternoons.

== Editorial staff ==
Editor Todd Wylie was former assistant editor of NZ Performance Car magazine.

== Notable contributors ==
V8 Supercar driver Jason Richards has a monthly column. New Zealand V8s driver Andy Booth presents NZV8 TV.

== Government policy ==
Like its sister publication NZ Classic Car NZV8 has supported various parties in lobbying Land Transport NZ for easing rules on car modification, frontal impact laws for low volume vehicle certification and steering systems. It is recognised by the V8 industry as working for their benefit.

== Awards ==
Publisher Greg Vincent received the Meguiar's Collector's Car Person of the Year Award.

== See also ==
- Car Design News
- Motor Trader Magazine
