= NZ Performance Car =

- NZ Performance Car logo
- Editor: Deven Solanki
- Former editors: Sean Managh, Matt Greenop, Brad Lord, Peter Kelly, René Vermeer
- Categories: Automotive
- Frequency: Bi-monthly
- Circulation: Approx. 17,000 (2008) (within NZ)
- Publisher: Parkside Media
- First issue: June 1996
- Company: Parkside Media
- Country: New Zealand
- Based in: Auckland
- Language: English
- Website: www.performancecar.co.nz
- ISSN: 1176-5690

NZ Performance Car issue 143, November 2008.

NZ Performance Car issue 13 in October 1997 featured a Shelby GT350, a car more at home on the cover of NZ Performance Car's sister publication NZV8.

NZ Performance Car is a monthly automobile magazine and website, and is the biggest selling automotive and men's lifestyle magazine in New Zealand.

NZ Performance Car issue 100

As Parkside Media's second title, it has eclipsed the success of NZ Classic Car. NZ Performance Car has evolved with the times, promoting the import drag racing scene, building the drifting scene and supporting modified car events such as Auto Salon and dB Drag Racing.

Issue 1 of the magazine was bundled free with NZ Classic Car issue 66 (June 1996), and featured a Series 4 Mazda RX-7 on the cover.

== Change in focus ==
The magazine's focus has evolved from initially covering all high performance cars, including Australian V8s, Japanese import cars, and more recently import car culture and associated activities (BMX, FMX, and interviews with local and international musicians, etc.).

Early issues featured cars such as Holden Toranas alongside Mitsubishi Galant VR4s.

=== Typical cars featured in NZ Performance Car ===
- Honda Civic
- Honda Integra
- Honda S2000
- Mazda 323
- Mazda GTX
- Mazda RX-7
- Mitsubishi Galant VR4
- Mitsubishi Lancer Evolution
- Nissan 300ZX
- Nissan 350Z
- Nissan Laurel
- Nissan Pulsar GTI-R
- Nissan Silvia
- Nissan Skyline GT-R
- Subaru Legacy
- Subaru WRX
- Toyota Altezza
- Toyota Celica
- Toyota Chaser
- Toyota Levin AE86
- Toyota Supra
- Toyota Hilux

== Magazine contents ==
=== Modified car features ===
The extent that a car is required to be modified has steadily increased since the first issues. While 300 hp was considered to be a huge amount of power when the magazine started, 300 kW may not even secure a spot as a feature car, unless the rest of the car is outstanding or unusual. This is not to say that NZ Performance Car solely focuses on power, but power figures are part of a more holistic approach considered when modifying a car.

=== New car features ===
Less common are new car road tests. Recent examples have included the Mazda RX-8, Mini Cooper John Cooper Works (JCW), and BMW 135i.

=== Cover girls ===
Female nudity in association with the magazine has polarised readers. The magazine took an online poll at the end of 2008, the results of which found that more than 80% of readers wanted to keep the cover girl.

Cars were originally graded using a Jane-o-meter (a picture of Jane with a ranking from one to ten). This method was scrapped after car owners became reluctant to have their cars featured in case it received a low mark.

=== Poster ===
Two posters (a double-sided A2) have been included in most issues of the magazine since issue 80.

=== Event coverage ===
Drag racing, drifting, rallying, Super Lap, Japanese Super GT, hillclimbing, touring cars, auto salon, auto shows and club events are covered, as long as the racing includes Japanese cars.

=== Driver and celebrity interviews ===
Local and international drivers have been interviewed, such as Ken Block, Rhys Millen, Mike Whiddett, Sébastien Loeb, Linkin Park/Fort Minor and Nathalie Kelly (from The Fast and the Furious: Tokyo Drift).

=== Regular sections ===
Regular sections include readers' letters, a technical question and answer section, equipment information, CD/DVD/game reviews, and a lifestyle section with clothing and related culture.

=== Chop shop ===
A monthly Photoshop competition is run. An image of a standard car is modified in Photoshop to adopt a certain theme or style, such as hakosuka, rally, etc. In issue 144 readers were invited to Photoshop a Chevrolet Volt into a Pro Import drag racing vehicle.

== Growth ==
Readership peaked at 336,000 in 2007. To address the fall in readership since then, NZ Performance Car was relaunched with perfect binding, a new logo, and a broader focus on the import car culture in issue 132, December 2007.

== Notable contributors ==
Contributors include Karl Burnett and Ewen Gilmour.

== Special issues ==
=== Drop! (previously "Street Style") ===
Drop! features hardcore modified show cars, auto salon features, and SPL competitions (dB drag racing). The emphasis on Japanese imports is less. Previous featured cars have included a Jaguar, a Buick, a Nash Metropolitan, and several types of minitruck.

=== Drift Factor ===
Drift Factor is a drifting special with driver interviews, in-depth profiles on drifting and the cars, and how-tos on starting in drifting.

=== Raceline (previously Race Style) ===
Raceline is dedicated to circuit racing, rallying, hillclimbing, drifting and drag racing.

=== Yearbook ===
The Yearbook is a round up of the scene and also contains many of the similar features to the magazine.

=== Posterbook ===
A posterbook has been produced yearly since 2005 with 12 A2 posters of cars and/or cover models.

=== Spine art ===
For 2008, collecting all the issues created an NZ Performance Car logo when stacked together. This was to highlight the transition to perfect binding.

== Website ==
NZ Performance Car relaunched its website in July 2007 with a web 2.0 site featuring video, blogs, forums, news, articles, cover girls, event coverage and more. Users can register on the site, start a blog, upload their own media, and generally interact with the site.

Daily news articles are available on weekdays, which are additional to magazine content. Full magazine articles are available from previous issues, often including additional photos and information (including videos) that could not be fitted into the magazine.

Some writers run blogs on the website, such as Peter Kelly's Pedeyworld, and a forum is run as a subsite to encourage user interaction.

Users can purchase books and DVDs related to the magazine's content, as well as back issues and subscriptions in the online shop.

=== Social networking sites ===
A Facebook fan page, Bebo page (for NZ Drift Series), and YouTube channel exist.

== Games ==
NZ Performance Car has produced several online games.

- Drift Legends is a drifting game which features New Zealand tracks as well as custom tracks. Players can submit their score to a score board.
- Super Lap Legends was released to coincide with Super Lap. It features New Zealand racetracks in a time trial format.
- Midnight Sting is a shoot 'em up in which players protect their ride from damage in a dark alley.
- Britney's Rehab Run is a shoot 'em up which sees the player attempt to get Britney Spears to rehab past scores of paparazzi.

== Mobile ==
A free opt-in text club which has more than 23,000 members is utilised to share special offers from sponsors, and promote the magazine, games and events.

NZ Performance Car is also one of the largest suppliers of mobile content (ringtones, screen wallpapers and the like) via Vodafone's network.

== NZ Performance Car TV ==
NZ Performance Car TV is a free-to-air television programme in its eighth series. It has had airtime on TV ONE, TV2, Prime and Sky Sports, often simultaneously, which is unique in its genre. Each series consists of 13 episodes. Two series are usually screened per year.

First airing in 2004, the series has evolved to match the changing tastes of the import car scene. Series 8 had a large focus on drifting.

== Events ==
=== NZ Drift Series ===
The NZ Drift Series is a drifting motorsport series run on New Zealand tracks. It made its debut in 2007 with a professionally run, five-round championship series.

=== Super Lap ===
Parkside Media organised the first Super Lap event at Taupo Motorsport Park in April 2007. Scott Kreyl in a Mitsubishi Lancer Evo VIII took the overall win. At the second event at Pukekohe in March 2008 Kreyl successfully defended his title.

The third Super Lap returned to Taupo Motorsport Park in 2008 where Kreyl suffered mechanical problems and failed to place.

=== New Zealand Bikini Model Search ===
Toured throughout in New Zealand in 2007, the NZ Bikini Model Search culminated in a grand final in Auckland.

=== Import All-Stars ===
Every summer, NZ Performance Car organises the biggest import drag racing event of the year at Fram Autolite Dragway, Meremere, Import All-Stars. Guest competitors are invited from Australia to race against New Zealand's quickest imports.

=== Drag Masters ===
Drag Masters, run in 2005, was a V8 vs. import drag racing event held at Fram Autolite Dragway, Meremere.

=== Performance Car of the Year ===
Performance Car of the Year is a competition with 12 performance cars where users text their vote.

== Awards ==
Cam Leggett, designer since issue 68, has won two awards for Designer of the Year at the MPA Awards in the Special Interest Category in 2007 and 2008.

== Controversy ==
NZ Performance Car magazine has typically been criticised by groups not in favour of import car culture, or those concerned about 'boy racer' activity.

In June 2008, editorial assistant Peter Kelly organised a meeting in Hamilton to scout for feature cars. News quickly spread via text and over 1000 people descended on The Base. Despite attempts by NZ Performance Car to warn the police, messages went unanswered.
