= Wolfwood =

Wolfwood is a surname. Notable people with the surname include:

- Theresa Wolfwood, director of the Barnard Boecker Centre Foundation in Victoria, British Columbia, Canada

== Fictional characters ==
- Nicholas D. Wolfwood, a Trigun character
