= NZ Drift Series =

- NZ Drift Series logo (2008)
- Category: Drifting
- Country: New Zealand
- Inaugural season: 2007
- Drivers: 48

The NZ Drift Series was a five-round motorsport series organised by Parkside Media, publisher of NZ Performance Car magazine. Competing against D1NZ it achieved greater success because of NZ Performance Car and NZ Performance Car TV's marketing power.

The inaugural season was in 2007 and consisted of two rounds at Manfeild Autocourse and Pukekohe Park Raceway.

The 2008 season expanded the number of rounds to five and the number of tracks to four, including Taupo Motorsport Park, and a round in the South Island at Powerbuilt Tools International Raceway, Ruapuna.

The 2009 season continued with five rounds, including the new Hampton Downs Raceway.

The series helped propel some New Zealand drivers into the world arena, with top drivers such as Carl Ruiterman, Gary Whiter and Mike Whiddett being invited to compete overseas in events such as D1GP World Allstars, Red Bull Drifting World Championship, Formula D and European Drift Championship

== Television ==
NZ Drift Series is shown on the TVNZ network as part of Powerbuilt Tools Motorsport and NZ Performance Car TV, and TVNZ ondemand. Battle highlights are available on NZ Performance Car's Youtube channel.

== Technical specifications ==
All vehicles must be a ‘series production vehicle’ of ‘closed vehicle’ unitary construction, rear-wheel drive only. The engine can be at the front (FR) or mid-mounted (MR). The type and manufacturer of the vehicle is not restricted. Superchargers and turbochargers are permitted, but nitrous oxide is not. The vehicle's engine does not have to be the original, and significant modifications can be made to the lubrication, cooling and exhaust systems, suspension, brakes and steering as long as series regulations are met, and maximum decibel (dB) levels are not exceeded at the track. Maximum tyre width is 265.

The cars must comply with Motorsport New Zealand regulations for closed racing cars, including a rollcage, fire extinguisher and safety harness.

== Points system ==
The basic points system is as follows:

=== Final battles ===
- 1st – 200 points,
- 2nd – 160
- 3rd – 140
- 4th – 120
- 5th – 100
- 6th – 80
- 7th – 60
- 8th – 40
- First Round losers – 20 points each

=== Qualifying ===
Qualifying works on a descending points system with the top qualifier receiving 32 points and the 32nd qualifier receiving one point.

=== Event entry ===
- Event Entry 20
- Pre-Entered Competitors minus 30 points for non-attendance per event.

=== Miscellaneous ===
- Hard Yards Award – 5 points
- Flag infringements - minus 50 series points
- Drifting or speeding outside allocated areas on track – minus 20 series points per infringement.
- Burnouts outside allocated areas or specified times – minus 20 series points per infringement.
- Bodywork infringement – minus 5 series points

== How drifting is judged ==
=== Qualifying point scoring ===
- Speed: 0 – 30 Points
- Angle: 0 – 30 Points
- Line: 0 – 30 Points
- Smoke/Noise: 0 – 10 Points

=== Battle point scoring ===
- Speed – 25 Points
- Angle – 25 Points
- Chase – 50 Points

== 2009 season ==
=== Dates ===
- Round 1: May 16 - Manfeild
- Round 2: July 12 - Pukekohe Park Raceway
- Round 3: September 13 - Hampton Downs Motorsport Park
- Round 4: October 17 - Taupo Motorsport Park
- Round 5 (Grand Final): November 21 - Hampton Downs Motorsport Park

== 2008 season ==
=== Dates ===
Series dates for the 2008 season:

- Round 1: Saturday March 22, Pukekohe Park Raceway, Pukekohe, Auckland
- Round 2: Saturday May 17, Manfeild Autocourse, Feilding, Manawatu
- Round 3: Saturday September 20, Powerbuilt Tools International Raceway, Ruapuna, Christchurch
- Round 4: Sunday October 12, Taupo Motorsport Park, Taupō
- Round 5 (Grand Final): Sunday November 23, Pukekohe Park Raceway, Pukekohe, Auckland

=== Results ===
		Round 1	Round 2	Round 3	Round 4	Final	Total
Entrant	Car No.	Pukekohe	Manfeild	Christchurch	Taupō	Pukekohe	
Carl Ruiterman	1	211	211	150	144	20	736
Steven Sole	22	165	241	62	82	180	730
Tiger White	6	63	67	249	67	124	570
Daniel Woolhouse	2	0	192	211	60	71	534
Mike Whiddett	4	146	-10	106	212	20	474
Darren McDonald	3	109	104	121	65	68	467
Jason Sellers	15	248	25	59	68	62	462
Nick Teeboon	5	67	65	185	63	69	449
Gary Whiter	8	92	20	63	251	20	446
Hamish Marsden	44	190	27	23	34	170	444
Takeshi Teruya	57	64	142	20	59	143	428
Curt Whittaker	9	59	66	64	190	29	408
Kyle Jackways	13	32	58	-10	36	237	353
Jonathan Bennett	62	30	75	68	161	-10	324
Aaron Bennett	12	61	30	92	58	72	313
Cole Armstrong	81	0	0	0	114	198	312
Daynom Templeman	71	0	0	65	126	87	278
Brad Smith	17	60	129	-10	32	66	277
Johnny Udy	30	0	0	167	0	106	273
Sam Groombridge	26	24	159	36	-10	59	268
Shane Rutland	21	33	60	27	29	31	180
Brendan Duncker	59	57	57	57	-10	-10	151
Gee Mutch	11	34	68	-10	-10	65	147
Shaun Yearbury	56	102	35	0	0	0	137
Vinny Ryan	60	35	28	28	25	20	136
Rian Herrick	14	31	21	-10	57	36	135
Nathan Stalker	69	0	83	0	30	0	113
Sam Bleakley	48	25	31	-10	33	30	109
Bradley Lauder	64	26	24	-10	27	26	93
Dave Steedman	40	28	29	-10	26	20	93
Andre Stanway		0	0	0	35	35	70
Lee McLean	66	-10	33	30	23	-10	66
Chris Protheroe	45	0	32	29	0	0	61
Troy Forsythe	32	0	0	58	0	0	58
Nick Callagher	63	27	23	-10	-10	27	57
Blair Martin	67	0	36	0	0	20	56
Andrew Redwood	56	63	-10	-10	-10	20	53
Richard Lunn	47	29	20	0	0	0	49
Cody Collis	68	0	22	26	0	0	48
Jesse Porter	27	23	20	0	0	0	43
Mark O'Hara	74	0	0	35	0	0	35
Dwayne Rhind		0	0	0	0	34	34
Hans Ruiterman	70	0	34	0	0	0	34
Nick Shrimpton	31	0	0	34	0	0	34
Gene Rhodes	23	0	0	33	0	0	33
Marcus King		0	0	0	0	32	32
Simon Hunter	73	0	0	32	0	0	32
Matai Watson	76	0	0	31	0	0	31
Matt Jackson	16	36	-10	-10	24	-10	30
Alu Mutch	37	22	26	-10	-10	0	28
Bruce Tannock	79	0	0	0	28	0	28
Shane Harris		0	0	0	0	28	28
Matthew Smith	75	0	0	25	0	0	25
Anthony McQuoid	72	0	0	24	0	0	24
Micah Hoebers	80	0	0	0	22	0	22
Nikki Pilcher	78	0	0	22	0	0	22
Tony Breman	49	0	0	21	0	0	21
Nick McConcie	77	0	0	-10	0	0	-10
Mark Holland	57	-10	-10	-10	-10	-10	-50

== 2007 season ==
=== Results ===
Position	Car No.	Entrant	Manfeild (2 Jun)	Pukekohe (15 Jul)	Total
1	14	Carl Ruiterman	211	241	452
2	24	Curt Whittaker	224	85	309
3	30	Adam Richards	169	127	296
4	1	Daniel Woolhouse	150	132	282
5	12	Tiger White	60	190	250
6	15	Mike Whiddett	167	46	213
7	29	Nick Teeboon	133	68	201
8	3	Darren McDonald	20	171	191
9	7	Jairus Wharerau	72	63	135
10	2	Gary Whiter	DNS	129	129
11	8	Rian Herrick	62	39	101
12	6	Francis Aro	106	-30	76
13	20	Gee Mutch	63	30	93
14	21	Steve Mitchell	34	58	92
15	17	Aaron Bennett	58	20	78
16	16	Shane Rutland	57	10	67
17	22	Jonny Udy	65	DNS	65
18	13	Jamie Blair	DNS	62	62
19	33	Andre Stanway	61	DNS	61
20	4	Matt Jackson	DNS	57	57
21	69	Brad Smith	DNS	55	55
22	31	Matt Clark	35	14	49
23	18	Kyle Jackways	-30	69	39
24	33	Mike Turley	39	0	39
25	57	Jason Sellers	DNS	36	36
26	58	Keith Punn	36	DNS	36
27	60	Greg Munt	13	20	33
28	28	Jesse Porter	DNS	32	32
29	32	Clay Buskermolen	DNS	26	26
30	34	Victor Chapman	20	DNS	20
31	23	Shane Harris	DNS	15	15
32	26	Hamish Marsden	DNS	8	8

== Demise ==
Parkside Media decided in 2009 not to run NZ Drift Series in 2010 and began coverage of D1NZ in NZ Performance Car starting with the final round in August 2009.

== NZ Drift Series in popular media ==
NZ Drift Series is included as one of the country series in the iPhone game Drift Legends
