= The Photographer's Mail =

- The Photographer's Mail logo
- Categories: photography
- Frequency: Monthly
- Circulation: 17,000
- Publisher: Parkside Media
- Founded: 1991
- Company: Parkside Media
- Country: New Zealand
- Based in: Auckland
- Language: English
- ISSN: 1171-9214

The Photographer's Mail was the only commercial photography industry publication in New Zealand. It was a monthly broadsheet newspaper published eleven times a year, that was distributed free to the professional photography community.

== History and profile ==
The Photographer's Mail was launched in 1991 as a free magazine. The magazine was purchased by Parkside Media in 2007 to complement D-Photo magazine which focuses more on consumer and enthusiast photography.

The Photographer's Mail

In January 2010, it was announced that Parkside Media was to suspend publication of The Photographer's Mail for the time being, in a statement from the editor, published in the forums of the sister title D-Photo. The Photographer's Mail was restarted as a bi-monthly magazine and is currently in print by Parkside Media.

== Magazine contents ==
As of the November 2008 issue, the typical contents included:

- Editor column
- Readers' letters
- Exhibition listings
- USA report
- New Zealand photography news, including new product releases
- Competition
- Interview with a professional photographer
- PSNZ, AIPA and NZIPP news
- Trade noticeboard
- Image editing tutorial
- How-to feature

== Website ==
The Photographer's Mail shared its website with D-Photo. Daily news articles were available weekdays which were additional to magazine content. Full magazine articles were available from previous issues, often including additional photos and information (including videos) that could not be fitted into the magazine. No physical back issues are stored of the magazine.
