= Super Lap (disambiguation) =

Super Lap is a time attack race event held in Australia and New Zealand. This may also refer to:

- Time attack, a race event where racers have to beat the best time
- Super Lap Battle, an American time attack race event
