= Putrajaya Hospital =

Hospital in Putrajaya, Malaysia

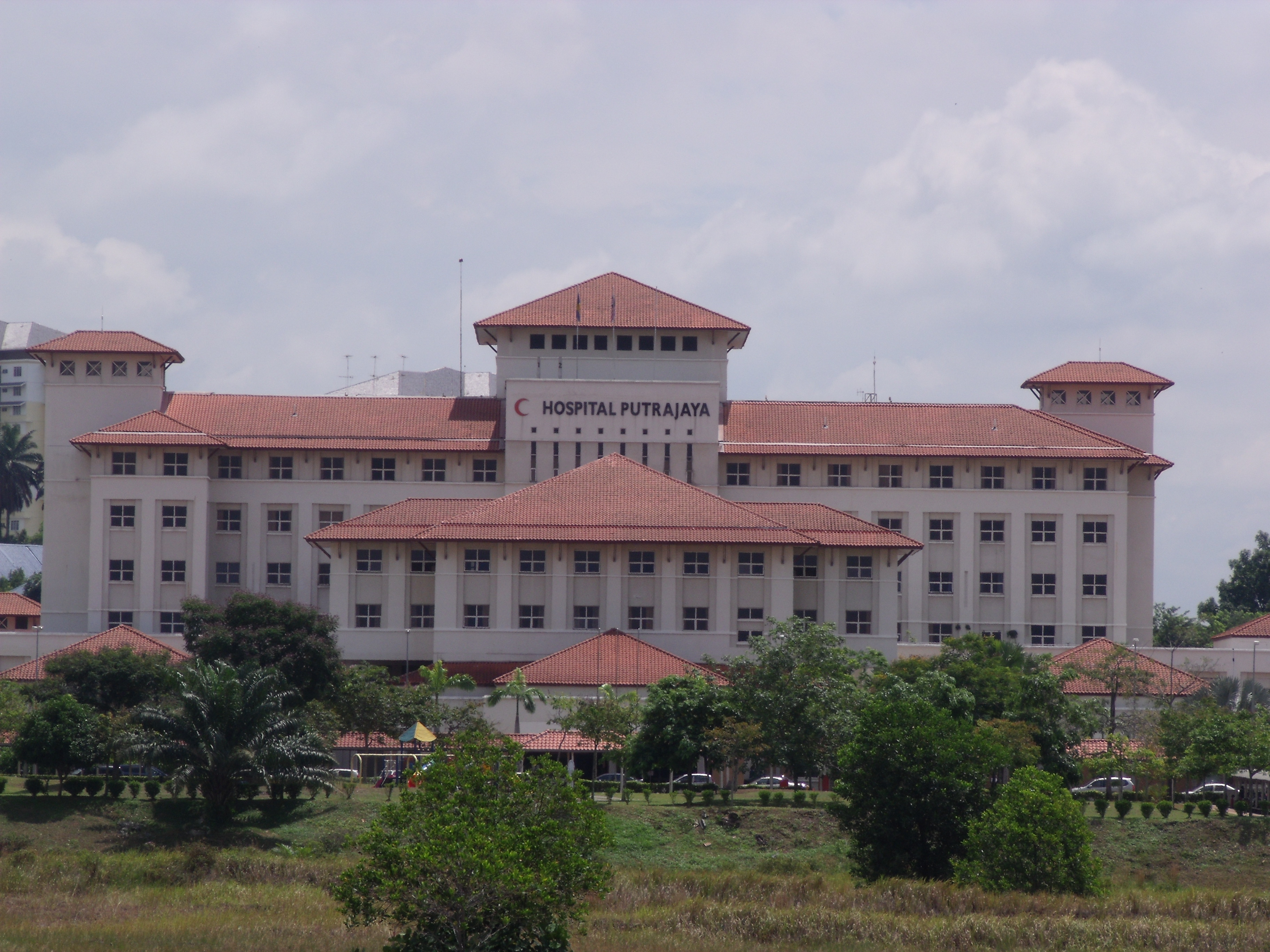

Geography
- Location: Putrajaya, Wilayah Persekutuan, Malaysia
- Coordinates: 2.9291°N 101.6742°E

Organisation
- Funding: Government hospital
- Type: District General

Services
- Emergency department: Yes
- Beds: 369

Helipads
- Helipad: Yes

History
- Opened: 1998

Links
- Website: www.hpj.gov.my
- Lists: Hospitals in Malaysia

Putrajaya Hospital is a Malaysian government-owned rural general hospital in the administrative region of Putrajaya. Originally founded in 1998, this hospital has 369 beds. As a hospital located in the Multimedia Super Corridor, it has managed and maintained the hospital using the Full Hospital Information System ("Total Hospital Information System - T.H.I.S.").

== History ==
Putrajaya Hospital (HPj) is a hospital located in an area of 27.2 acres (11.0 ha) in Precinct 7, Putrajaya. The hospital was first built in 1998 at a cost of RM283 million and operated in stages on 1 November 2000. Originally HPj only had 278 beds and has increased to 341 beds in 2012 with the establishment of a Low Risk Maternity Center in Precinct 8 and is now operational with 369 official beds starting January 2018.

== Future developments ==
The Malaysian government has awarded engineering firm George Kent (M) Berhad a RM364.9 million contract to complete an endocrine extension to Putrajaya Hospital. Putrajaya Hospital is the tertiary referral centre for endocrine diseases, which include diabetes and hormonal disorders.

== Achievement ==
Putrajaya Hospital is also one of the hospitals accredited by the Malaysian Society for Quality in Health (MSQH).

== Notable patients ==
- Abdul Hadi Awang – Malaysian politician
- Kento Momota – Japanese badminton player
- Kim Jong Nam – Son of North Korean leader Kim Jong-il
- Sivasangari Subramaniam – Malaysian professional squash player
- Wee Ka Siong – Malaysian politician

== Notable staff ==
- Noor Hisham Abdullah – Endocrine surgeon

== See also ==
- Healthcare in Malaysia
