= Nona (magazine) =

Malaysian women's magazine

- Managing Editor: Kiffy Razak
- Categories: Women's magazine
- Frequency: Monthly
- Publisher: Kumpulan Media Karangkraf Sdn Bhd (Karangkraf) & Nu Ideaktiv Sdn Bhd (Ideaktiv)
- Founded: November 1986
- First issue: November 1986
- Company: Astro Malaysia Holdings (Astro) & Karangkraf
- Country: Malaysia
- Based in: Shah Alam
- Language: Malay
- Website: www.nona.my
- ISSN: 1675-0438
- OCLC: 1027883024

Nona is a women's magazine published in Malaysia. It has been published monthly in the Malay language by Shah Alam-based Kumpulan Media Karangkraf Sdn Bhd (Karangkraf) since November 1986. The magazine's tagline is "Realiti Impian Wanita", literally meaning the 'Reality of Women's Dream'.

Beside its print version, Nona has been published digitally online since 2012. On 2 May 2018, Karangkraf entered a joint venture with Astro Malaysia Holdings (Astro) to establish a content company, Nu Ideaktiv Sdn Bhd to manage Nona and other magazines owned by the group. The magazine targets the 25 – 45 years old female readers market. The statistics of Google Analytics in June 2020 show the print version of the magazine has a circulation of 30,000 copies monthly while the digital website has 2.16 million visitors, 8.29 million page views as well as 274 thousand Facebook followers and 1.01 million average reach and also 256 thousand Instagram followers.

Nona is a prestigious women's lifestyle Malay magazine featuring the Malaysian royalty, social elite, top celebrities and influencers. It also covers the latest fashion, lifestyle and beauty trends as well as exclusive interviews and success stories.

== Awards and recognitions presented ==
=== Nona Superwoman Award ===
Nona as a women's magazine in Malaysia has organised and presented the Nona Superwoman Award to honour outstanding individuals especially women who have contributed to good causes in various fields. Former cabinet minister, Rafidah Aziz was first to receive the inaugural Nona Superwoman Award in 2018. At the 2020 Nona Superwoman Award, Siti Hasmah Mohamad Ali, wife of former Prime Minister Mahathir Mohamad was the main recipient meanwhile Noor Hisham Abdullah, former Health Director-General leading the fight against COVID-19 pandemic in Malaysia was honoured with a special Nona Frontliner Award.

=== Nona Superhero Award ===
In December 2021, the Nona magazine and Ideaktiv started presented the Nona Superhero Award for especially to top excelled men in the country as a continuity of the Nona Superwoman Award. The inaugural recipients men among others were Dr Noor Hisham Abdullah for second time again, who had received 2020 Nona Superwoman Award a year earlier and youth politician Syed Saddiq Syed Abdul Rahman.

== Awards and recognitions received ==
Nona has managed to garner some awards and recognitions notably the MPA Magazine Awards of Magazine Publishers Association Malaysia. Among the awards are :

- 2014 MPA Magazine Awards – Silver Award – Category Women – Bahasa Melayu
- 2016 MPA Magazine Awards – Bronze Award – Category Women – Bahasa Melayu

== See also ==
- List of women's magazines
- List of magazines in Malaysia
