= Meremere Power Station =

New Zealand power station (1958–1991)

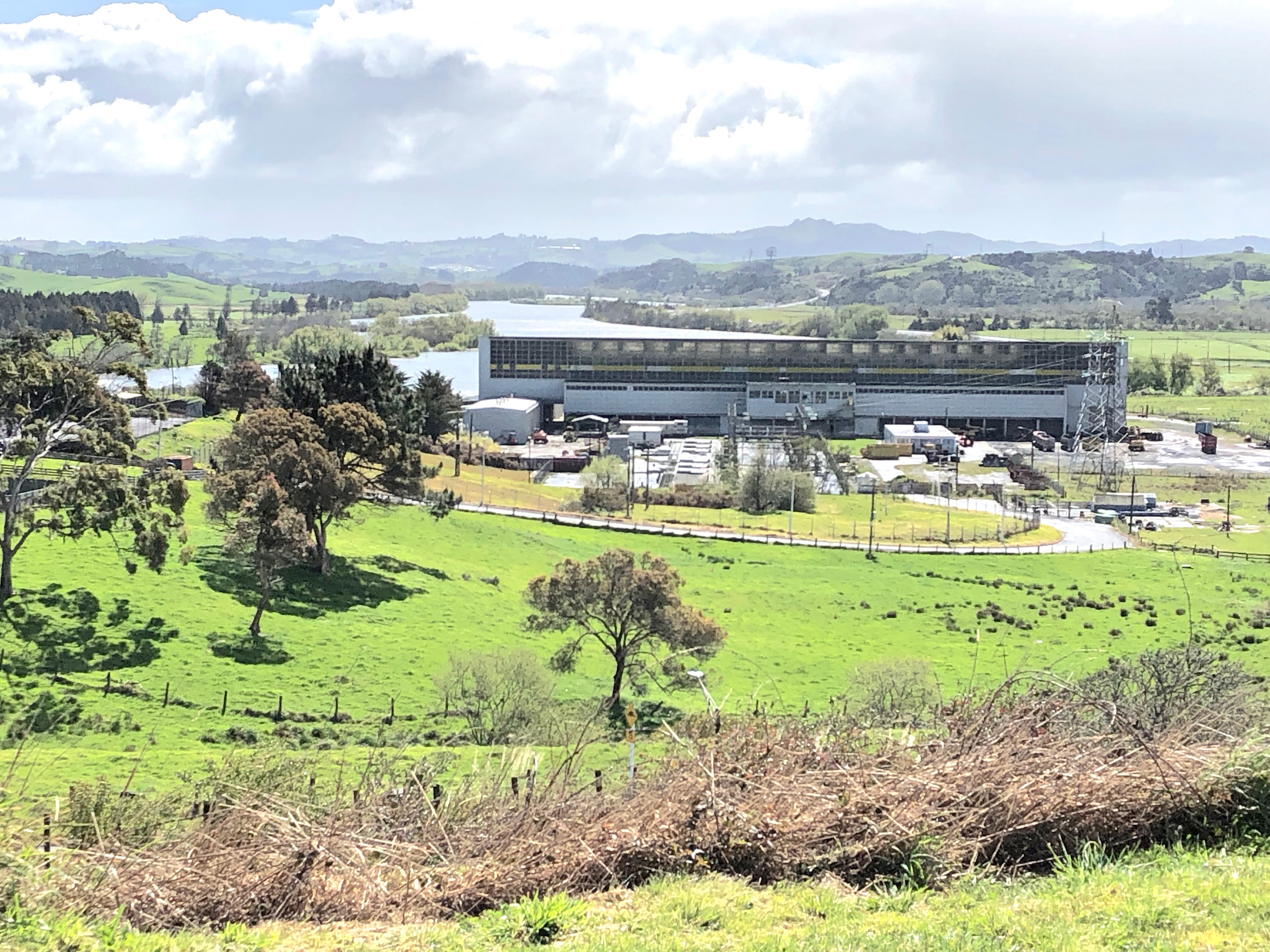
- Meremere power station and Waikato River from pā site in 2019
- Country: New Zealand
- Location: Meremere, Waikato
- Coordinates: 37°18′51″S 175°4′6″E
- Status: Decommissioned
- Commission date: 1958
- Decommission date: 1991
- Owner: Electricity Corporation of New Zealand

Thermal power station
- Primary fuel: Coal

Power generation
- Units operational: 7
- Nameplate capacity: 210 MW

Meremere Power Station is a former coal-fired power station on the Waikato River at Meremere, approximately 64 kilometres (40 mi) south of Auckland, New Zealand. Meremere was the first major coal-fired power station in New Zealand, and was commissioned to help meet the increasing electricity demands of New Zealand, and especially Auckland, after World War II.

The first six 30MW units were commissioned in 1958. The commissioning of Meremere, and Atiamuri Dam further upstream on the Waikato River, meant post-war electricity restrictions were finally lifted in December that year. An additional seventh unit commissioned in April 1967.

Two-thirds of Meremere's annual 800,000-tonne coal requirements was met by the nearby Maramarua coalfield, with coal delivered to the power station by a twin aerial ropeway. The remaining one-third of coal came from other mines, and was railed to Meremere via a private siding off the North Island Main Trunk.

Meremere last produced power in December 1990 and was decommissioned in March 1991 after 33 years in service.

== See also ==
- List of power stations in New Zealand
