= Import All-Stars =

The Import All-Stars logo

Import All-Stars is an import (i.e. Japanese cars) drag racing event organised by Parkside Media and NZ Performance Car magazine. First held in 2007, it was rerun on 29 March 2008. Both events have been held at Fram Autolite Dragway, Meremere.

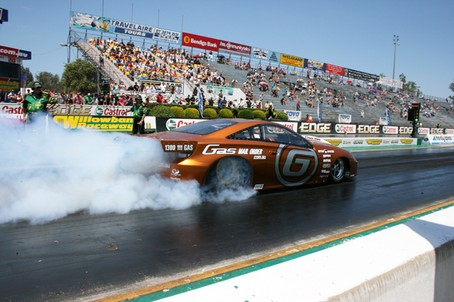
The GAS Motorsport Celica performs a burnout pre-staging at Import All-Stars, Meremere, 2008

The drawcard for 2008's event was the GAS Motorsport Pro RWD Toyota Celica vs the Rayglass Toyota Celica Pro Stock. Both cars are capable of six-second passes on the drag strip.

This match was in jeopardy when the GAS Motorsport Celica crashed at Willowbank Raceway just weeks before. The car was repaired and arrived in New Zealand on time. Disaster almost struck again as Joe Signorelli's parachutes failed in a shakedown run.
