= Theresa Wolfwood =

Theresa Wolfwood is the director of the Barnard Boecker Centre Foundation in Victoria, British Columbia, Canada. She organizes, writes and speaks on issues concerning peace, social justice, women, globalization and human rights. She participated in the World Peace Forum in Vancouver and was an international election observer in El Salvador in June, 2006. She co-coordinates Victoria Women in Black.

She has written for Briarpatch, Peace Magazine, Peace News, Third World Resurgence & other publications. Her essays have been included in the following books:

- Challenging Empires: World Social Forum, Eds. Jai Sen et al. 2004. Viveka Foundation, New Delhi, India;
- Feminist Perspectives: September 11, 2001. Eds. Susan Hawthorne & Bronwyn Winter. 2002. Spinifex Press, Australia. Reprinted as AFTER SHOCK: September 11, 2001;
- Global Feminist Perspectives, 2003. Raincoast Books, Vancouver, BC;
- There is an Alternative: Subsistence and Worldwide Resistance to Corporate Globalization, Eds. Veronika Bennholdt-Thomson, Nicholas Faraclas and Claudia Von Werlhof, Zed Books Ltd. London, UK. 2001.

She is a published poet, many of her poems reflect her passion for peace and social justice.

Her photographs have been published and exhibited in several countries and her banner art has also been widely shown.
