= Noor Hisham Abdullah =

Malaysian civil servant and endocrine surgeon

Yang Berbahagia Tan Sri Dato' Seri Noor Hisham Abdullah PSM SPMS SPMP SSNS SSAP PJN DMPN DPMP KMN
- نورهشام بن عبدﷲ
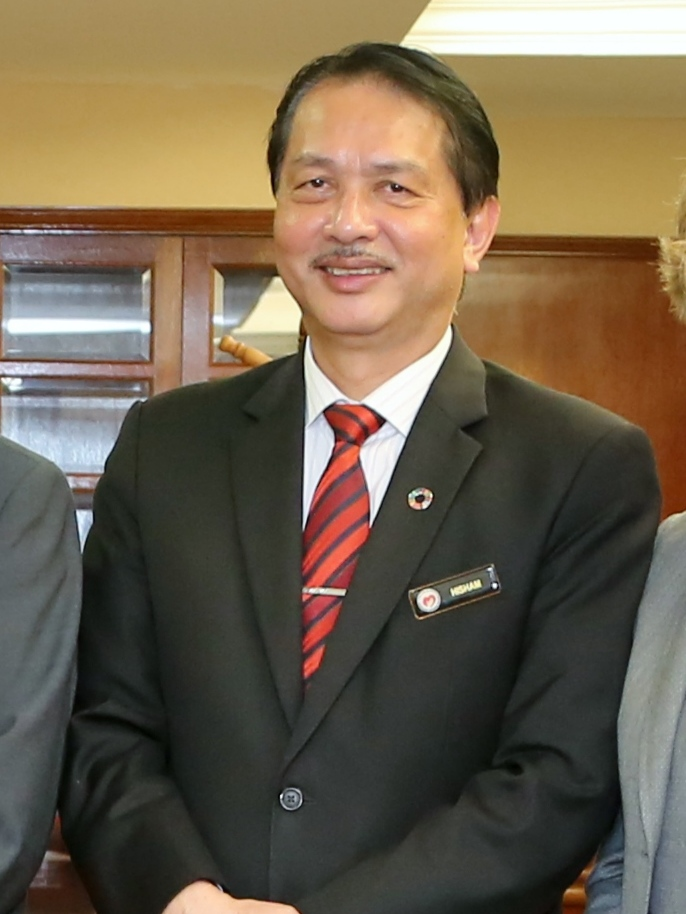

Director-General of Health
- In office 1 March 2013 – 21 April 2023
- Monarchs: Abdul Halim (2013–2016); Muhammad V (2016–2019); Abdullah (2019–2023)
- Prime Minister: Najib Razak (2013–2018); Mahathir Mohamad (2018–2020); Muhyiddin Yassin (2020–2021); Ismail Sabri Yaakob (2021–2022); Anwar Ibrahim (2022–2023)
- Minister: Liow Tiong Lai (2013); Subramaniam Sathasivam (2013–2018); Dzulkefly Ahmad (2018–2020); Adham Baba (2020–2021); Khairy Jamaluddin (2021–2022); Zaliha Mustafa (2022–2023)
- Preceded by: Hasan Abdul Rahman
- Succeeded by: Muhammad Radzi Abu Hassan

Deputy Director-General of Health (Medical)
- In office 1 February 2008 – 1 March 2013
- Monarchs: Mizan Zainal Abidin (2008–2011); Abdul Halim (2011–2013)
- Prime Minister: Abdullah Ahmad Badawi (2008–2009); Najib Razak (2009–2013)
- Minister: Ong Ka Ting (Acting) (2008); Liow Tiong Lai (2008–2013)
- Director-General: Hasan Abdul Rahman

Personal details
- Born: Yew Ming Seong; 21 April 1963 (age 63) Sepang, Selangor, Federation of Malaya (now Malaysia)
- Citizenship: Malaysian
- Spouse: Nik Suwaida Nik Mohammad Mohyideen
- Children: 6
- Education: Methodist Boys' School; Kolej Islam Klang; Sekolah Sultan Alam Shah
- Alma mater: National University of Malaysia (MD, Master of Surgery (MS))
- Profession: Endocrine surgeon
- Known for: One of the most prominent leaders in the fight against the COVID-19 pandemic in Malaysia

Noor Hisham bin Abdullah (né Yew Ming Seong; born 21 April 1963) is a Malaysian retired civil servant as well as breast and endocrine surgeon. He was the Director-General of Health and President of Malaysia Medical Council from March 2013 to his retirement in April 2023. Prior to the appointment, he served as the Deputy Director General of Health (Medical) from February 2008 to March 2013.

Hisham Abdullah was elected as the first chair for the World Health Organization (WHO) Standing Committee on Health Emergency Prevention, Preparedness and Response (SCHEPPR). He is a member of the Board of Directors of the Drug for Neglected Diseases Initiative (DNDi). For his contribution in Global Surgery Initiative, he was appointed as a member of Technical Advisory Group on Universal Health Coverage in the WHO Western Pacific Region (UHC TAG) as well as a member of transitional High-level Council for the Global Surgery Foundation.

Currently, he is the Chairman of National Heart Institute (Institut Jantung Negara), Chairman of UCSI Healthcare Group and Chancellor of Cyberjaya University.

Hisham Abdullah was a leading figure in Malaysia's response to the COVID-19 pandemic as well as the key figure in the effort to eliminate Hepatitis C in Malaysia and advancing Global Surgery initiative in the WHO Western Pacific Region and beyond.

== Early life and education ==
Born as Yew Ming Seong (姚明祥) on 21 April 1963 in Sepang, Selangor to a poor Chinese family of Fuzhounese descent, and is the second child out of three children. He spent his childhood in a kampung at Sungai Pelek. He was raised by his single mother after his parents separated since birth and had lived in the off Jalan Loke Yew's San Peng Flats, Pudu, Kuala Lumpur. He attended the Methodist Boys' School, Kuala Lumpur in Jalan Davidson.

Due to his family's poverty, Yew was adopted by an Ustaz of Kelantanese descent who was the principal of the Kolej Islam Klang (KIK) where he continued his upper secondary studies. He wanted to go into islamic studies in upper secondary school, but was convinced by the principal to pursue science due to his grades. He continued his pre-university education at Sekolah Sultan Alam Shah (SAS), Cheras. Later he married his adoptive father's daughter.

He obtained his primary medical degree in 1988, and Master in Surgery in 1994, both from National University of Malaysia (UKM). He went on to sub-specialise in breast and endocrine surgery through fellowship training in various universities in Adelaide and Sydney, Australia.

== Medical and Healthcare Administration Career ==
=== Medical Practice (1988–2023) ===
Hisham Abdullah started his medical career as a houseman at the Kuala Lumpur University Hospital in 1988, and later in the Accident and Emergency Department in 1989.

Upon receiving Master of Surgery, he was appointed as a general surgeon in Kuala Terengganu Hospital in 1994. After three years as a general surgeon, Hisham went on endocrinology fellowship training at various institutes in Australia.

Once returning from his fellowship in Australia, Hisham Abdullah was appointed as the head of the Breast and Endocrine Surgery Unit at the Kuala Lumpur Hospital in 1999. Three years later, in 2002, he took on the role of Head and Senior Consultant of Breast and Endocrine Surgery at Putrajaya Hospital, a position that he held until his retirement. Noor Hisham Abdullah was also the royal physician to the King of Malaysia during his clinical years.

As one of the pioneer in breast and endocrine surgery in Malaysia, Hisham Abdullah led the development of the service in the Ministry of Health, Malaysia. Through his leadership, an Endocrine Institute was built in Putrajaya Hospital. The new complex was officiated by then Health Minister, Khairy Jamaluddin in April 2022.

He is an expert in performing thyroidectomy under local anaesthesia, and incorporated acupuncture-assisted anaesthesia (AAA) in his technique. Hisham performed the first thyroidectomy with AAA at Raja Permaisuri Bainun Hospital, Ipoh with fellow consultant surgeon, Dr Yang Yang Wai, and Head of Anaesthesia Department, Dr Kavita M. Bhojwani in August 2015.

Hisham Abdullah has published in local and international journals, with a chapter entitled "Multinodular Goiter" in the Textbook of Endocrine Surgery, 2009 (Hubbard and C Y Lo, New York), and a chapter entitled "External Laryngeal Nerve" in the Textbook of Thyroid and Parathyroid Surgery 2010 (Randolph G). He has been on the editorial review board for several journals such as the Asian Journal of Surgery, Malaysian Medical Journal, and World Journal of Surgery.

Hisham had several special appointments such as the Royal Australasian College of Surgeons foundation visitor in Hong Kong in 2008 and Goatcher Surgeon in Residence for the Royal Perth Hospital in 2013.

For his work in advancing technique in difficult and complex endocrine surgery, Hisham was frequently invited to present at the international surgical conferences. The most notable lecture was given at the 48th World Congress of Surgery in Krakow, Poland when he delivered the Martin Allgöwer opening lecture in 2019, and the British Journal of Surgery Lecture, entitled "Investigation and Management of Retrosternal Goitre" in the 2010 Annual Meeting of the British Association of Endocrine and Thyroid Surgeons (BAETS) in Birmingham.

In the recognition of his service to the breast and endocrine surgery, Hisham Abdullah was elected chair of the Global Surgery Committee of the International Society of Surgery (ISS) in 2017. Hisham was also elected as the President of the Asian Association of Endocrine Surgeons (AsianAES).

Hisham Abdullah received the Excellence Service Award in 2000 and 2004 for the recognition of his service in Kuala Lumpur Hospital (HKL) and Putrajaya Hospital respectively. For his contributions in improving the nation’s health through various reforms and innovations coupled with the advancement of endocrine surgery, surgical training and research in Malaysia, Hisham was awarded the Fellowship Ad Hominem of the Royal College of Surgeons of Edinburgh (RCSEd) in February 2018. Three years later, he was awarded an international medal by the RCSEd to recognise his contribution for the surgery in Malaysia.

=== Director-General of Health (2013–2023) ===
Hisham Abdullah was the Deputy Director-General of Health (Medical) for five years from February 2008 before being promoted as the Director-General of Health in March 2013. He is one of the youngest Director-General of Health ever appointed by the Ministry of Health.

==== Role during the COVID-19 pandemic in Malaysia ====
Hisham Abdullah was the Director-General of Health in charge during the COVID-19 pandemic in Malaysia. In the National Crisis Preparedness and Response Centre (CPRC) formed by the Ministry of Health, the Director-General of Health chairs the Executive Committee for Disaster Management, which forms the central decision-making committee related to technical issues, with subsequent flow of command to a national technical committee, the National CPRC, and operations rooms at state as well as district levels. Hisham Abdullah was acknowledged for his role as a competent leader; effective manager, and diligent personnel in tackling the unprecedented COVID-19 pandemic.

Following the 2020 Malaysian political crisis, Hisham Abdullah stepped into COVID-19 press briefing during the political power vacuum period. In order to provide a clear risk communication and cultivate confidence from the nation during global health crisis, the cabinet agreed that Hisham should continue the national COVID-19 daily press briefing despite the appointment of the new Health Minister, Dr. Adham Baba, who was widely criticised when he falsely claimed that drinking warm water can protect from COVID-19.

Hisham's daily COVID-19 briefings were praised for their calm, clear delivery during the pandemic. He was acknowledged for effective crisis communication that reassured Malaysians since the commencement of the Movement Control Order (MCO). Daily press conference at 1700 hours, followed by press dialogues, strengthened the flow of information from the Ministry of Health to the nation. Through this regular press conferences, the Malaysian government deployed a consistent risk communication approach, through which Hisham emerged as a familiar, apolitical leader amid political calamity, representing frontline health care workers and serving as a trusted conveyor of relevant information.

On 6 April 2020, Hisham Abdullah announced that Malaysia had started the worldwide Solidarity Trial by the WHO to collect reliable data and compare the safety and effectiveness of four COVID-19 treatment protocols using different combinations of Remdesivir, Lopinavir/Ritonavir, Interferon beta, Chloroquine and Hydroxychloroquine.

In the same month of April 2020, Drugs for Neglected Diseases initiative (DNDi) announced that Hisham had joined the COVID-19 Clinical Research Coalition to accelerate research into the pandemic in often neglected resource-poor settings.

The China Global TV Network (CGTN), had recognised Dr. Noor Hisham as among the “top doctors” of the world alongside America's Dr. Anthony Fauci and New Zealand's Dr. Ashley Bloomfield for the handling of COVID-19 pandemic. He also was named again among the COVID-19 heroic trio by Singaporean news outlet, The Independent.

==== Role in Improving Equity and Access to the Treatment of Hepatitis C and Eliminating Hepatitis C in Malaysia ====
Malaysia as a developing country is often caught in a middle-income nation trap where some drugs are patented and access to new drugs is impossible due to exorbitant price despite the availability of generic drugs elsewhere. With the assistance of Third World Network (TWN), Drugs for Neglected Diseases initiative (DNDi), and Médecins Sans Frontières/Doctors Without Borders (MSF), Hisham provided a leadership and direction to improve access and equity for the Hepatitis C treatment in Malaysia.

In 2017, the Ministry of Health, Malaysia initiated a negotiation with Gilead Sciences Inc for the voluntary license of a miracle drug for Hepatitis C, Sofosbuvir. Despite multiple efforts, negotiation broke down and forced Malaysia to issue compulsory license in an effort to increase accessibility of the drug which was previously priced at €43,000 for one person’s 12-week treatment of sofosbuvir. Due to the exorbitant price, the Ministry of Health, Malaysia then decided to trigger Doha Declaration on TRIPS and Public Health (Doha Declaration) in 2001 by member nations of the World Trade Organisation, in order to bring down the cost of the treatment to USD300 per course thus sparking hostile legal backlash from Gilead Sciences Inc and the United States.

In response to Malaysia's action, Gilead then announced on Twitter that it had included Malaysia in the voluntary license for its wonder drug Sofosbuvir. Hisham faced gruelling cross-examinations by the patent lawyers and the Medicines Patent Pool (MPP) committee in Geneva to defend the country's decision to issue a compulsory license for Sofosbuvir.

In his leadership as the Director-General of Health, Malaysia also started a new drug trial for Hepatitis C treatment with DNDi. This then lead to the improvement in the treatment of Hepatitis C with much greater success cure rate with the introduction of Ravisdavir. It is the first drug produced through south-south collaboration to improve access and equity for the treatment of Hepatitis C. In August 2023, World Health Organization (WHO) included Ravidasvir in the list of essential medicine (EML).

==== Role in Advancing Global Surgery Initiative ====
Through the Ministry of Health team, Hisham led Malaysia and WHO Western Pacific Region to develop the Action framework for Safe and Affordable Surgery in the WHO Western Pacific Region (2021-2030).

In Malaysia, 94% of the population have access to basic surgery. Yet, this figure masks important differences within the country, with two million people in East Malaysia without access to timely surgery and waiting times for elective surgery more than six months. Hence, through the Global Surgery Initiative, Malaysia strategically targeting these and other areas of need based on an analysis of waiting times, geographical distribution of surgical facilities by level and other performance indicators.

As a breast and endocrine surgeon, Hisham regularly participated in teaching and training the difficult thyroidectomy procedure, most notably in Malaysia Field Hospital in Cox's Bazaar.

Through this global surgery initiative, the Ministry of Health developed smart partnership with the Federal Territories Islamic Religious Council (MAIWP) and built the MAIWP Cataract Surgery Centre in Selayang that offers free cataract surgery for underprivileged patients as compared to RM3,000 in private hospital or eye clinic. Additionally, Hisham led the Ministry of Health to develop Klinik Katarak KKM to eliminate preventable blindness by delivering high-quality cataract surgery to underserved populations in Borneo.

To ensure good surgical outcome when delivering these services, the Ministry of Health partnered with the International Agency for the Prevention of Blindness (IAPB) via E-Cusum initiative that managed to reduce post-cataract surgery complication to less than 0.2% in 2017. By contrast, up to 36% patient were unable to see 6/60 and 1.5% developed blindness following cataract surgery in certain countries.

In expanding global surgery initiative, the WHO Executive Board (EB152/3) recommend that the World Health Assembly adopted a resolution on “Integrated emergency, critical and operative care for universal health coverage and protection from health emergencies” in April 2023. The emergency, critical and operative care services are an integral part of a comprehensive primary health-care approach and are essential to meet people’s health needs.

==== Role in Health for All ====
Alongside the Health Minister, Dr. Zaliha Mustafa, Hisham Abdullah was appointed as the Executive Board Member representing the Western Pacific Region. Together, they drove the advocation for equity and access of healthcare service to all, without any discrimination.

==== Professional Recognition and Accolades ====
On 4 July 2020, Hisham was awarded the '2019 Most Notable Alumni' by his alma mater UKM's Medical Faculty.

On 18 March 2021, a year since the first COVID-19 pandemic Movement Control Order (MCO) was imposed, Hisham received the Ibn Khaldun Merit Award of International Islamic University Malaysia (IIUM) from its chancellor Raja Permaisuri Agong, Tunku Azizah Aminah Maimunah Iskandariah.

Hisham Abdullah received the International Surgical Fellowship Award from the International Society of Surgery (ISS) during the 'Virtual Surgical Week' (VSW 2021) held from 30 August to 3 September.

In 2021, Hisham was awarded an International Medal by the RCSEd to recognise his contribution for the surgery in Malaysia.

==== Social Recognition and Accolades ====
On 19 August, he was named as the recipient of the national level Maal Hijrah Figure Award 2020AD/1442AH. Hisham received the Rotary Club's Paul Harris Fellowship, the highest honour given by them to individuals who have contributed to good causes, from the club Kuala Lumpur Chapter on 13 September.

On 17 July, he received the BrandLaureate Award 2020 for Outstanding Brand Leadership along with the 'Certificate of Recognition and Appreciation' for Ministry of Health by the World Brand Foundation. On 18 December, women's magazine Nona honoured him with a special Nona Frontliner Award during the Nona Superwoman Award 2020 presentation. On 20 December, he was presented a special award during the Anugerah MeleTOP Era 2020 (AME 2020) jointly hosted by Astro's both MeleTOP television entertainment programme and ERA radio station.

On 15 December, the Nona magazine presented Hisham again, who had received 2020 Nona Superwoman Award a year earlier, for the main 2021 Nona Superhero Award this time. On 18 December, Hisham awarded 2021 Leadership Award by the Malaysia Public Relations and Communication Association (PRCA) to recognises and honours his dedication in giving interviews to keep the public updated.

==== In popular culture ====
In October 2020, Noor Hisham appeared as an animated character along with characters from BoBoiBoy franchise in a one-minute public service announcement to remind Malaysians to take steps to prevent COVID-19.

==== Retirement ====
On 10 April 2023, it was reported that Hisham would retire from his career after 35 years and being as Director-General of Health for slightly more than a decade on 21 April 2023, as he would reach 60 and the mandatory retirement age for civil servants. Nine-days later on the 19th April 2023, Hisham clocked out for the last time at the Ministry of Health. He said that his post-retirement plan was to take a rest after his long work.

Following retirement from public service, he was appointed as the Chairman of National Heart Institute (Institut Jantung Negara), Chairman of UCSI Healthcare Group and Chancellor of Cyberjaya University.

== Controversies and Issues ==
=== Controversial political tweets and posts ===
In 2018, Noor Hisham was criticised for his politically inclined retweets. These tweets were viewed as pro-Barisan Nasional, who were the then-ruling coalition during the 2018 general election (GE14) campaign. One of his retweets was a message by former Prime Minister Najib Razak's, containing a photo announcing the ceremony of the Hospital Kajang women and children's complex with a verse of his hopes for BN's return to the state power of Selangor. Prior to that, Noor Hisham had also retweeted another message from Najib that showed a picture of Najib on a visit to the Kuala Lumpur Hospital, sending that BN would implement more for mothers and children if it continues to be given the mandate.

Noor Farida Ariffin, a spokesperson for G25 (a group of eminent ex-civil servants of Malaysia), stated that Noor Hisham was abusing his position as public servants were not supposed to campaign for any political party. A founding member of G25 and former Treasury secretary-general, Mohd Sheriff Kassim said that the Ministry of Health should lodge a complaint against Noor Hisham to the Election Commission (EC).

The electoral reform group, Bersih 2.0, also gave criticism to Noor Hisham by stating that he was in breach of public service regulations. He was named in Bersih's 'Hall Of Shame' alongside Najib. Bersih has stated that they were appalled that the Ministry of Health allowed its Facebook page to promote BN's manifesto during the GE14 campaign.

=== SOP breach allegation ===
On 21 March 2021, photos of Noor Hisham were circulated online showing him going against the standard operating procedure (SOP) of the ongoing conditional movement control order (MCO). The photos display Noor Hisham and other family members standing closely without any face masks for a photo-op during the wedding reception of his daughter. As a result, Noor Hisham has been criticised online for not setting a good example to the public.

=== Ineffective Health DG claims ===
In July 2021, the former health DG Tan Sri Dr Mohamed Ismail Merican rebuked Noor Hisham as a "toothless tiger" for not being effective in leading the nation's COVID-19 pandemic management by failing to be firm with decisions, as well as being pressured by politicians. Dr Mohamed Ismail, who was the former position holder in charge of the 2003 SARS outbreak, opined that if politicians tried to interfere, they would be told to stay calm and stop meddling.

== Personal life ==
Noor Hisham is married to Nik Suwaida Nik Mohyideen, a Kelantanese Malay woman who is also the daughter of his Ustaz former principal cum adoptive father during his schooling days and has six children; four sons and two daughters. He also has a son from a previous marriage.

Noor Hisham has played sports since his younger days. He was a school athlete, played football during university days and enjoys scuba diving including underwater photography. His hidden singing talent was revealed after an old video clip of him rendering the Shanghai Beach or Seung Hoi Tan (上海灘), a famous 1980s Cantopop song, resurfaced on social media.

In addition, he is also known as a polyglot medical practitioner, being able to communicate fluently in English, Malay, several Chinese languages, including his native Hockchew, Cantonese (the commonly spoken vernacular of the urban Klang Valley area), as well as Mandarin, and is also a basic Tamil speaker.

== Honours ==
=== Honours of Malaysia ===
- Malaysia
  - Commander of the Order of Loyalty to the Crown of Malaysia (PSM) – Tan Sri (2020)
  - Commander of the Order of Meritorious Service (PJN) – Datuk (2007)
  - Officer of the Order of the Defender of the Realm (KMN) (2004)
- Negeri Sembilan
  - Knight Grand Companion of the Order of Loyalty to Negeri Sembilan (SSNS) – Dato' Seri (2021)
- Pahang
  - Grand Knight of the Order of Sultan Ahmad Shah of Pahang (SSAP) – Dato' Sri (2013)
- Penang
  - Companion of the Order of the Defender of State (DMPN) – Dato' (2013)
- Perlis
  - Knight Grand Commander of the Order of the Crown of Perlis (SPMP) – Dato' Seri (2013)
  - Knight Companion of Order of the Crown of Perlis (DPMP) – Dato' (2010)
- Selangor
  - Knight Grand Commander of the Order of the Crown of Selangor (SPMS) – Dato' Seri (2020)

=== Foreign honours ===
- Brazil
  - Grand Officer of the Order of Rio Branco (2023)

=== Honorary degrees ===
- Malaysia
  - Honorary Ph.D. degree in Leadership in Public Health from Universiti Kebangsaan Malaysia (2021)
  - Honorary Ph.D. degree in Medical Sciences from Universiti Sains Islam Malaysia (2025)
