= Meremere =

Settlement in Waikato, New Zealand

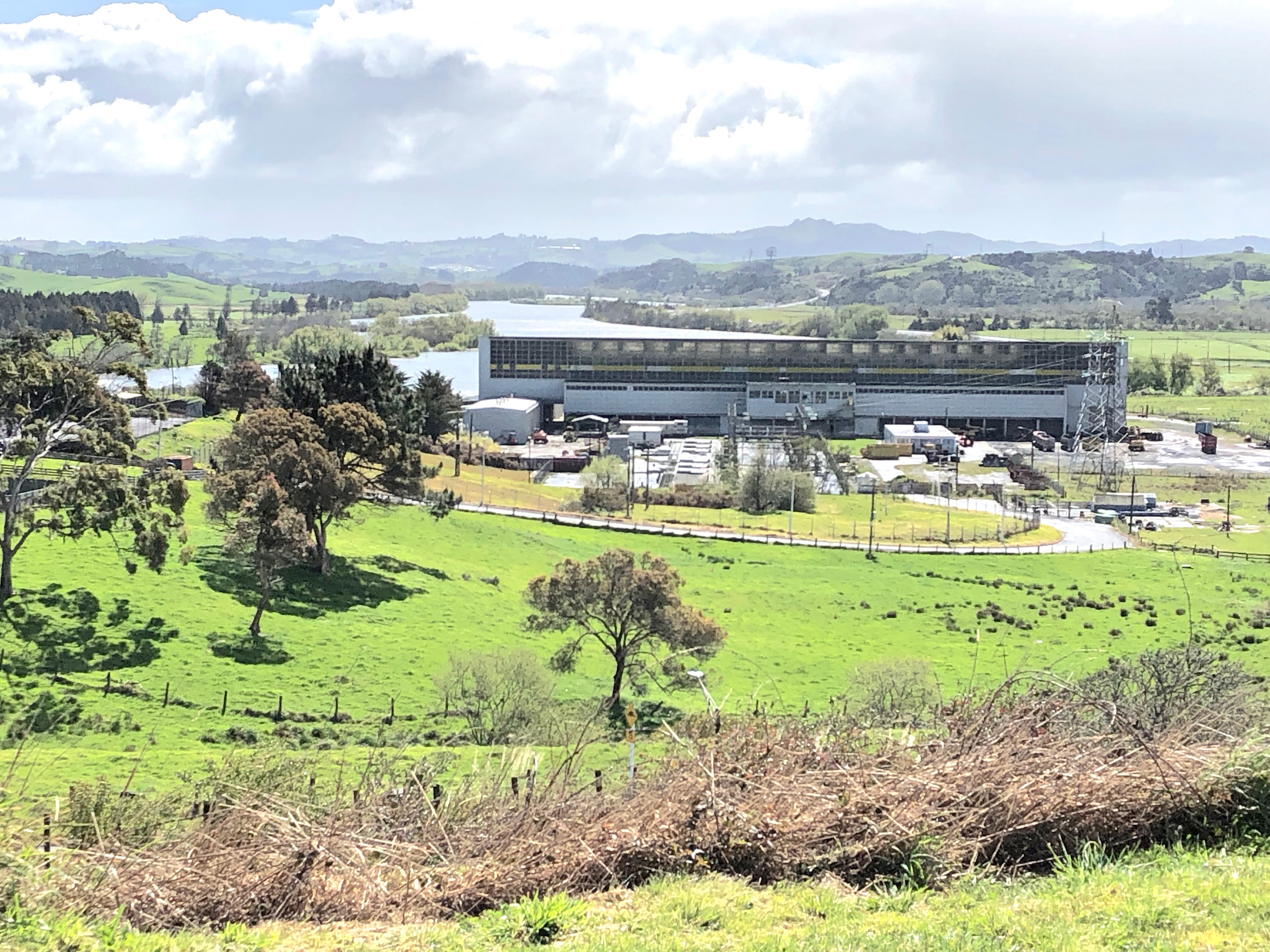
- The decommissioned Meremere power station
- Interactive map of Meremere
- Coordinates: 37°19′S 175°04′E
- Country: New Zealand
- Region: Waikato
- District: Waikato District
- Wards: Waerenga-Whitikahu General Ward; Tai Raro Takiwaa Maaori Ward
- Electorates: Port Waikato; Hauraki-Waikato (Māori)

Government
  - Territorial Authority: Waikato District Council
  - Regional council: Waikato Regional Council
  - Mayor of Waikato: Aksel Bech
  - Port Waikato MP: Andrew Bayly
  - Hauraki-Waikato MP: Hana-Rawhiti Maipi-Clarke

Area
  - Total: 1.59 km^{2} (0.61 sq mi)

Population (June 2025)
  - Total: 610
  - Density: 380/km^{2} (990/sq mi)

Meremere is a small town in the northern Waikato region in the North Island of New Zealand. It is located on the east bank of the Waikato River, 50 kilometres north of Hamilton and 63 km south of Auckland.

Meremere was the site of fighting in 1863 during the New Zealand Wars, at which time the settlement (then known as Mere Mere) was the site of a Māori defensive outpost.

For a number of years a coal-fired power station operated in Meremere, and much of the workforce lived in the town. The station was the first government-built large scale thermal power station, opening in 1958 and was a notable landmark for travellers along State Highway 1, which runs past the town. An aerial ropeway carried buckets of coal to the station from the Maramarua coal mine. The station closed in 1991 and there were plans during the 1990s to convert the station into a waste to energy plant, using waste from Auckland. These plans, known as the Olivine project, did not eventuate. The site was used as a recycling centre from 2007 to at least 2017.

== Demographics ==
Statistics New Zealand describes Meremere as a rural settlement, which covers 1.59 km^{2} (0.61 sq mi) and had an estimated population of 610 as of June 2025, with a population density of 384 people per km^{2}. Meremere is part of the larger Maramarua statistical area.

Historical population
Year	Pop.	±% p.a.
2006	462	—
2013	468	+0.18%
2018	546	+3.13%
2023	573	+0.97%

Meremere had a population of 573 in the 2023 New Zealand census, an increase of 27 people (4.9%) since the 2018 census, and an increase of 105 people (22.4%) since the 2013 census. There were 309 males and 267 females in 180 dwellings. 2.1% of people identified as LGBTIQ+. The median age was 32.4 years (compared with 38.1 years nationally). There were 174 people (30.4%) aged under 15 years, 81 (14.1%) aged 15 to 29, 276 (48.2%) aged 30 to 64, and 39 (6.8%) aged 65 or older.

People could identify as more than one ethnicity. The results were 55.5% European (Pākehā); 46.1% Māori; 16.2% Pasifika; 10.5% Asian; 0.5% Middle Eastern, Latin American and African New Zealanders (MELAA); and 1.0% other, which includes people giving their ethnicity as "New Zealander". English was spoken by 94.8%, Māori language by 9.4%, Samoan by 1.6%, and other languages by 9.9%. No language could be spoken by 3.7% (e.g. too young to talk). New Zealand Sign Language was known by 1.0%. The percentage of people born overseas was 18.3, compared with 28.8% nationally.

Religious affiliations were 25.7% Christian, 2.6% Hindu, 1.6% Islam, 3.1% Māori religious beliefs, 1.0% New Age, and 1.6% other religions. People who answered that they had no religion were 57.1%, and 7.3% of people did not answer the census question.

Of those at least 15 years old, 57 (14.3%) people had a bachelor's or higher degree, 201 (50.4%) had a post-high school certificate or diploma, and 141 (35.3%) people exclusively held high school qualifications. The median income was $42,600, compared with $41,500 nationally. 30 people (7.5%) earned over $100,000 compared to 12.1% nationally. The employment status of those at least 15 was that 225 (56.4%) people were employed full-time, 39 (9.8%) were part-time, and 9 (2.3%) were unemployed.

== Drag strip ==
Meremere Dragway, New Zealand's only permanent drag racing facility, is nearby and hosts many popular motorsports events throughout the year including Import All-Stars, 4&Rotary Nationals, Nostalgia Drags, the IHRA Championships and Nightspeed Dragwars.

A new motorsports circuit has also been constructed alongside State Highway 1 to the south of Meremere, at Hampton Downs.

== Education ==
Meremere School is a co-educational state primary school, with a roll of 10 as of July 2026.

The school became a full primary school in 2019, introducing classes for Year 7 and 8.

A previous Meremere School operated from 1894 to 1990.

== Panorama ==
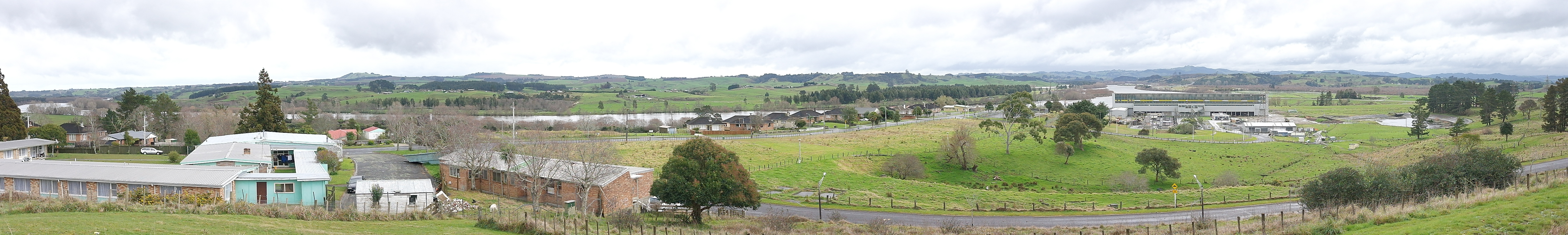
Panorama taken from the site of the historic pā in 2012, facing the highway and river. The power station is on the right.
