= DB drag racing =

dB drag racing is a competition rewarding the person who can produce the loudest sound inside a vehicle. The "dB" means decibels of sound pressure level (SPL). In these competitions, SPL of over 140 decibels is common; and the international record in 2003 was 171.5 dB, with records as high as 180 dB claimed more recently.

Competitive vehicles can range from a small vehicle with a single amplifier and subwoofer up to a large van with dozens of amplifiers and subwoofers powered by dozens of car batteries and with upgraded electrical wiring and alternators.

There were 10,000 competitors in 2003 and 300 "races". U.S. National Championships were held in Tennessee.

During a competition, the vehicle must be driven 6 m (20 ft). Nobody is allowed to sit in the vehicle during trials because injury would be certain. The vehicles are sealed tight to maximize containment of the sound energy for the decibel level meter. The competitor stands away from the vehicle with an on/off switch control while a computer voice announces the stages for the "races". The test tone consists of a very short resonating tone between 30 Hz and 70 Hz, called "the burp".
