= Hijabista =

Malaysian women's magazine

- Categories: Fashion magazine
- Frequency: Monthly (2012-2017); Quarterly (2017-2020); Online (2021-present)
- First issue: April 2012
- Final issue: October–December 2020 (print)
- Company: Kumpulan Media Karangkraf Sdn Bhd
- Country: Malaysia
- Based in: Shah Alam
- Language: Malay
- Website: www.hijabista.com.my
- ISSN: 1675-0381

Hijabista is a Malay fashion monthly magazine.

== History ==
It was first published in 2012.

Hijabista provided articles on Muslim women's fashion and is published on a monthly basis.
