= Roda-Roda =

Malaysian motorcycling periodical

- Cover of issue #436 of the magazine (April 2023)
- Categories: Motorcycle
- Frequency: Monthly (1986-2024); Online (2025-present)
- Circulation: 4,000 (2024)
- Founder: Mohamad Yusof Bakar
- First issue: November 1986
- Final issue: December 2024 (print)
- Company: Bayu D Enterprise Sdn Bhd
- Country: Malaysia
- Based in: Sungai Buloh
- Language: Malay
- Website: www.rodaroda.my

Roda-Roda is a Malay language motorcycle magazine published in Malaysia. It is published monthly since 1986 by Bayu Enterprise based at Bukit Rahman Putra, Sungai Buloh, Selangor.

Besides of motorcycle news and test ride reviews of the latest motorcycle models available in Malaysia as well as motorcycle racing reviews such as MotoGP and Malaysian Cub Prix, Roda-Roda also features test ride reviews and news related to motorcycles in other countries through its two journalists overseas, consisting Alan Cathcart (European region) and Clement Salvadori (American region).
