= Aswaq =

Malaysian tourism magazine

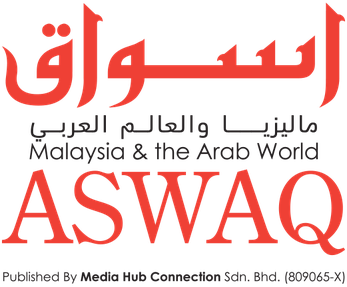
- Editor-in-chief: Abdulrahim Abdulwahid
- Categories: Tourism magazine
- Frequency: Monthly
- Publisher: Media Hub Connection
- Founded: 2009
- First issue: January 2009
- Country: Malaysia
- Based in: Ampang Jaya, Kuala Lumpur
- Language: Arabic, English
- Website: ASWAQ

ASWAQ is an Arabic magazine in Malaysia. The magazine is one of few Arabic magazines in the country, which is based in Kuala Lumpur. It covers all types of Malaysian business sectors and events, but focuses on tourism, education, investment, and trade related events, places, and organizations. It targets Arabic travellers to Malaysia specially those coming from Gulf Countries.

The magazine is now one of the most active Malaysian media partners to exhibitors and their logo can be seen in many international Malaysian exhibitions. such as 2013 INTRADE exhibition in November 2013, 11th WIEF (World Islamic Economic Forum).

== Description ==
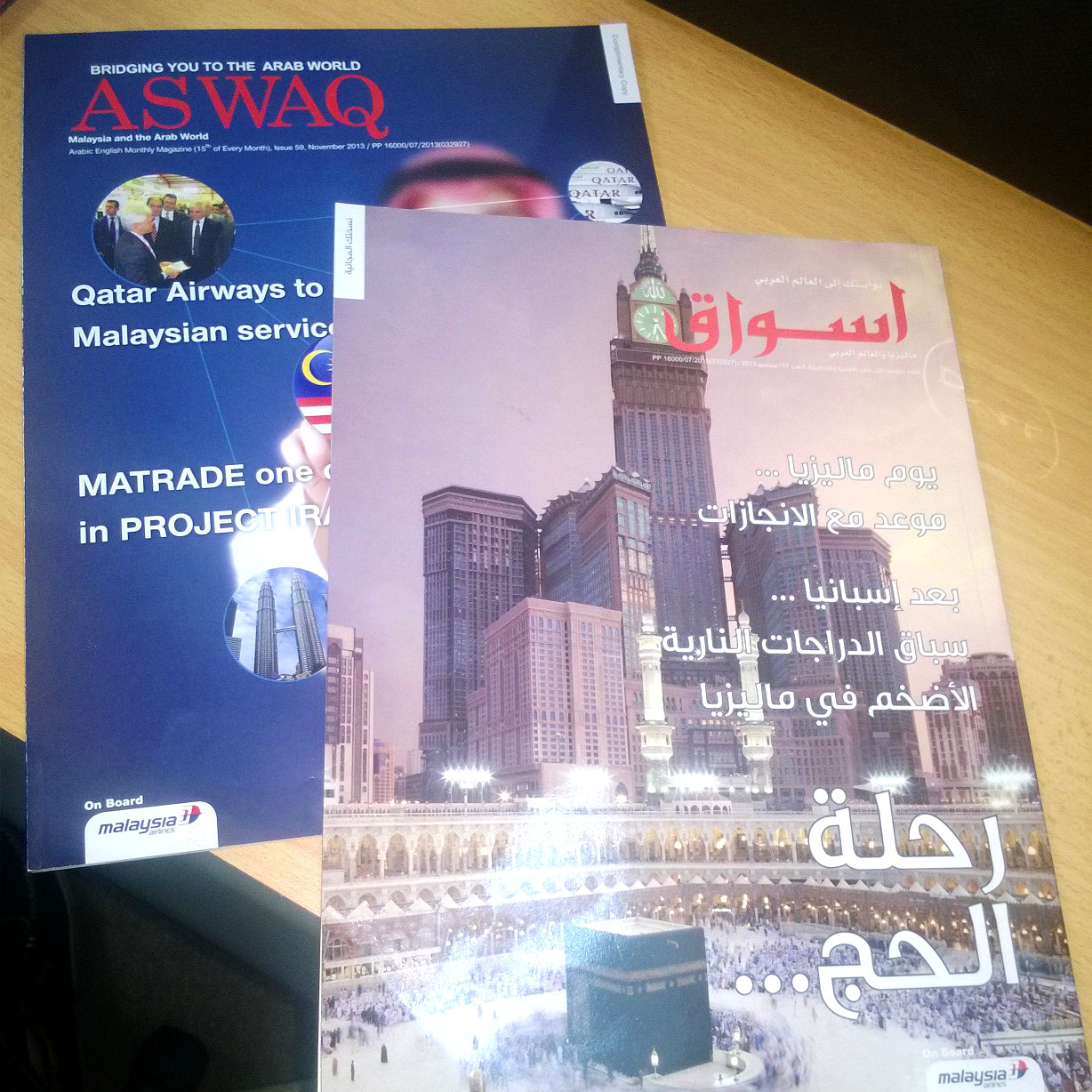
September (above) and November (under) Issues

The magazine, which has been issued since January 2009, is issued monthly. It is distributed free of charge and is mainly found on Malaysia Airlines flights, Airline Offices, and Airports in Malaysia and GCC countries. Previously the magazine was issued on the first day of the month however it is now issued on 15th of each month.

The Arabic/English magazine is distributed in many Arab countries. These including: Saudi Arabia, Kuwait, Qatar, Bahrain, Sultanate of Oman, Qatar, UAE, Morocco, Libya and Sudan.
