= NZ Classic Car magazine =

New Zealand magazine

- Editor: Ashley Webb
- Categories: automotive
- Frequency: Monthly
- Circulation: 10,743 (2008) (within NZ)
- Unpaid circulation: 159,000 (2008)
- First issue: Issue: January 1991 Publish date: 5 December 1990
- Company: Parkside Media
- Country: New Zealand
- Website: www.classiccar.co.nz
- ISSN: 1170-9332

NZ Classic Car is a monthly automotive magazine that has been published since December 1990. Its first issue was January 1991.

The magazine also has an associated website that covers all things related to classic and historic cars, events, clubs, and related car culture in New Zealand and to a lesser extent Australia.

== History ==
It was the first magazine to be published after the inception of Parkside Publishing by Gregory and Carolyn Vincent. The publication began as a simple idea to put local classic car owners in touch with shows, events, car clubs and trade professionals. The people chosen to write for the magazine, and to highlight the local classic car scene, were passionate about the subject, and were generally classic car owners themselves.

It is one of the longest running motoring magazines in New Zealand and is the third biggest selling car magazine behind NZ Performance Car and NZ Autocar.

The magazine celebrated its 200th issue in August 2007. Originally in black and white newsprint format the magazine is now glossy and bound.

The magazine and its contributors act as a voice for, and stand up for the rights of, people who want to enjoy classic and historic motoring. It has also featured many New Zealand motorsport personalities whose stories would have otherwise been forgotten or ignored, including Ross Jensen, Robbie Francevic, Ron Roycroft, Hec Green, Ralph Watson, Johnny Riley, Ken Smith, Spinner Black, and Howden Ganley.

A NZ Classic Car Yearbook is published just before Christmas. Five special issues on New Zealand motorsport and motoring history have also been published.

NZ Classic Car's offices are in Grey Lynn, Auckland, New Zealand.

== Government policy ==
The magazine is one of several that are recognised authorities by the New Zealand Government for defining a classic car or special interest vehicle and is usually mentioned in policy documents relating to transport changes that will affect classic and historic cars by Land Transport New Zealand.

== Magazine contents ==
A recent issue of NZ Classic Car (Issue 215 – November 2008).

As of the November 2008 issue, the typical magazine contents include:

- Feature car reviews (including old vs new comparisons and group tests)
- Historic photographs (predominantly of New Zealand's motoring history)
- Event overviews (such as historic racing, concours, etc.)
- Car and SUV news (new car news)
- Short high-end car reviews (e.g. Bentley, Aston Martin, Ferrari, Maserati and the like)
- Editor and contributor columns
- Crossword
- Scale model reviews
- Book reviews
- Events calendar
- Readers' letters
- Reader classifieds
- Restoration project
- Mystery car

== Website ==
Daily news articles are available weekdays which are additional to magazine content. Full magazine articles are available from previous issues, often including additional photos and information (including videos) that could not be fitted into the magazine. Some writers run blogs on the website, and a forum is run as a subsite to encourage user interaction.

Users can purchase books related to classic and historic cars, as well as back issues and subscriptions in the online shop. Crosswords from previous issues are loaded online.

== Editorial staff ==
The first editor of NZ Classic Car was Greg Vincent, the owner of Parkside Media. He passed editorial responsibility over in about 2000 (issue 101) to Allan Walton who had been with the magazine since its inception. Walton was well known in the classic motoring scene having been involved with classic cars since the early 1980s. Walton co-authored – along with acclaimed Christchurch photographer, Terry Marshall – Looking Back: The Motorsport Photography of Terry Marshall, a photo-book highlighting New Zealand motorsport from the 1960s to the 1980s.

== Controversy ==
NZ Classic Car has argued for the continued enjoyment of classic and historic cars by their owners. This has occasionally seen it make submissions to New Zealand government that may not be considered to be the most environmentally friendly options. NZ Classic Car argued to keep leaded petrol, and for exemptions on exhaust emissions for classic cars.

== Support of Targa in New Zealand ==
NZ Classic Car supported and sponsored Targa New Zealand from the first running in 1995. NZ Classic Car and Targa parted ways after the 2006 event.

== Intermarque Concours d'Elegance ==
Located at Ellerslie Racecourse, the Intermarque Concours d'Elegance runs every February. Held in Auckland, it is New Zealand's largest concours event. NZ Classic Car has had a presence at every event since 1991, and since 2004 has been the event's main sponsor.

== Awards ==
Long-time contributor Trevor Stanley-Joblin, and publisher Greg Vincent have both been recipients of the Meguiar's Collector's Car Person of the Year Award.
