= Carl Ruiterman =

New Zealand racing driver

- Nationality: New Zealand

D1NZ, NZ Drift Series, Drift Revolution career
- Debut season: 2005
- Current team: E&H Motors
- Best finish: 1st in 2007

Championship titles
- 2007: D1NZ 'Drift King', NZ Drift Series winner, Drift Revolution winner

Carl John Ruiterman is a drifting driver from Pukekohe, New Zealand. He was crowned the 2007 D1NZ champion driving a Nissan Silvia S14. He made his D1NZ debut during the 2005 season, driving a Nissan Skyline R32.

Ruiterman raced motocross for three years. He broke his elbow while racing, so he decided to modify and tune a Nissan Skyline specifically for drag racing. While drag racing he won the C2 class during the 2005/2006 Night Speed Dragwars. After this he decided to try drifting in his Skyline. He enjoyed drifting, so he teamed up with E&H Motors to build a serious drift car for racing competitively. Once the car was complete and Ruiterman more experienced he began to achieve better results, culminating in his first round win at round 1 2007. He went on to win one further round and with his consistency throughout the season was crowned 'Drift King' 2007.

Ruiterman also races in two other New Zealand drift series, Drift Revolution and NZ Drift Series. Ruiterman's consistency in both of these championships has earned him both titles in 2007.

Ruiterman is a manager at a workshop in Pukekohe when he is not drifting.

== 2007 Results ==
Carl completed the 'grand slam' of New Zealand drifting by winning all three major New Zealand drifting competitions.

Round	D1NZ	NZ Drift Series	Drift Revolution
1	1st	2nd	1st
2	8th	1st	Cancelled
3	3rd	DNF	1st
4	1st	2nd	1st
5	4th	1st	--
6	3rd	--	--
Overall	1st	1st	1st
