= Motor Trader Magazine =

Motor Trader Online
- Frequency: Weekly
- Publisher: PROTO Malaysia Sdn. Bhd
- Founder: Sir John Madejski
- Founded: 1998
- Company: PROTO Malaysia Sdn. Bhd
- Country: Malaysia

Motor Trader Online is a motoring guide in Malaysia. Started in 1998, the magazine is published by PROTO Malaysia Sdn. Bhd. Motor Trader Magazine's website lists over 41,000 cars, both new and used, in Malaysia.

== History ==
Motor Trader Online was started by Sir John Madejski in 1998. In 2011, Madejski sold the magazine and company to the Japanese conglomerate, PROTO Corporation.

Since 2012, Motor Trader has been the content provider for the Yahoo! Malaysia Autos page.

== Recognition ==
Motor Trader Magazine won Advertising & Marketing's Motor Vehicle Magazine of the Year in 2011 and 2013.

The Motor Trader website was described as "one of the most popular review and classified sites" in the automotive category in Malaysia by Marketing Magazine based on the results of a study made by Effective Measure, the market research analysts for online media in September 2013.
