= Parkside Media =

New Zealand publisher

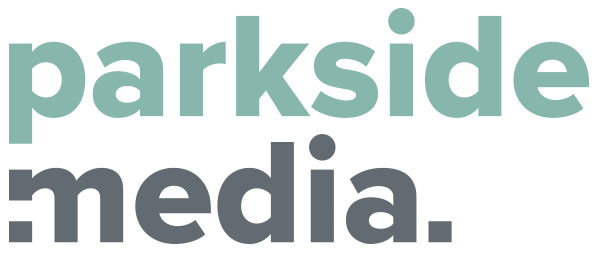
- Company type: Private
- Industry: Publishing, Media, Television, Internet
- Genre: Motorsport, Automotive, Photography, Technology
- Founded: Auckland, New Zealand, 1990
- Founder: Greg Vincent
- Headquarters: Level 2, 65 Upper Queen Street, Eden Terrace, Auckland, New Zealand
- Key people: Greg Vincent, Michael White
- Products: Books, magazines, websites, online games, television shows
- Services: Publishing, advertising, design
- Number of employees: 30
- Website: www.parksidemedia.co.nz

Parkside Media is a diversified media organization involved in print, television and online publishing as well as advertising, event management and public relations, among other client services.

== Magazines ==
It is one of the country’s largest independent magazine publishers. Its offices are in Eden Terrace, Auckland. Owner Greg Vincent established the company in 1990 when he founded New Zealand Classic Car magazine. The company went on to launch two more monthly motoring titles, NZ Performance Car in 1996 and NZV8 in 2005, which have proven durable with a loyal readership.

Parkside launched bi-monthly photography magazine D-Photo in 2004 and acquired another bi-monthtly, The Shed magazine, in 2017. It launched automotive trade magazine Auto Channel in 2018. Auto Channel is distributed free to the automotive industry each month.

Parkside publishes hardcover books and special editions on motoring events and celebrities, as well as calendars and other collateral.

Parkside Media publishes:

- NZ Performance Car
- NZ Classic Car
- NZV8
- The Shed

== Television ==
Parkside Media has produced NZ Performance Car TV in-house, a television show that aligns with NZ Performance Car magazine, and NZV8 TV which aligns with NZV8. NZV8 TV was presented by Andy Booth, former New Zealand V8s championship-winning driver.

== Internet ==
Parkside runs over 20 websites such as new car review site Car and SUV, several ecommerce sites, and websites for its magazine publications.

== Mobile ==
Parkside Media pioneered mobile publishing in New Zealand as one of the largest content suppliers to the Vodafone network in New Zealand for ringtones, screen wallpapers and video. It now publishes Drift Legends and other iPhone applications.

== Events ==
Parkside Media organises the NZ Drift Series, Super Lap and Import All-Stars. It has previously organised various model search and motorsport events, and is a key sponsor of Intermarque Concours d'Elegance.

== Awards ==
Cam Leggett, designer since issue 68 of NZ Performance Car has won two awards for Designer of the Year at the MPA Awards in the Special Interest Category in 2007 and 2008. Greg Vincent was the recipient of The Meguiar's Awards in 2004.
