= Third World Resurgence =

Third World Network magazine

Third World Resurgence is the flagship magazine of Third World Network, an international network of organizations and individuals involved in issues relating to environment, development and the Third World and North-South issues. The magazine was started in 1990. According to their website, the aim of the magazine is to give a Third World perspective to the whole range of issues confronting the Third World namely, the environment, health and basic needs, international affairs, politics, economics, culture, and so on. The magazine is published on a monthly basis and is headquartered in Penang, Malaysia. It has also a Spanish version.
