= Super Lap =

Time attack motorsport event

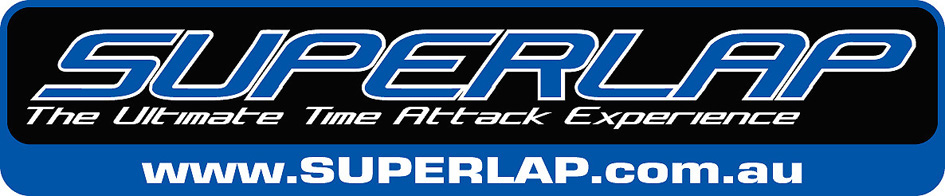
Superlap Australia logo

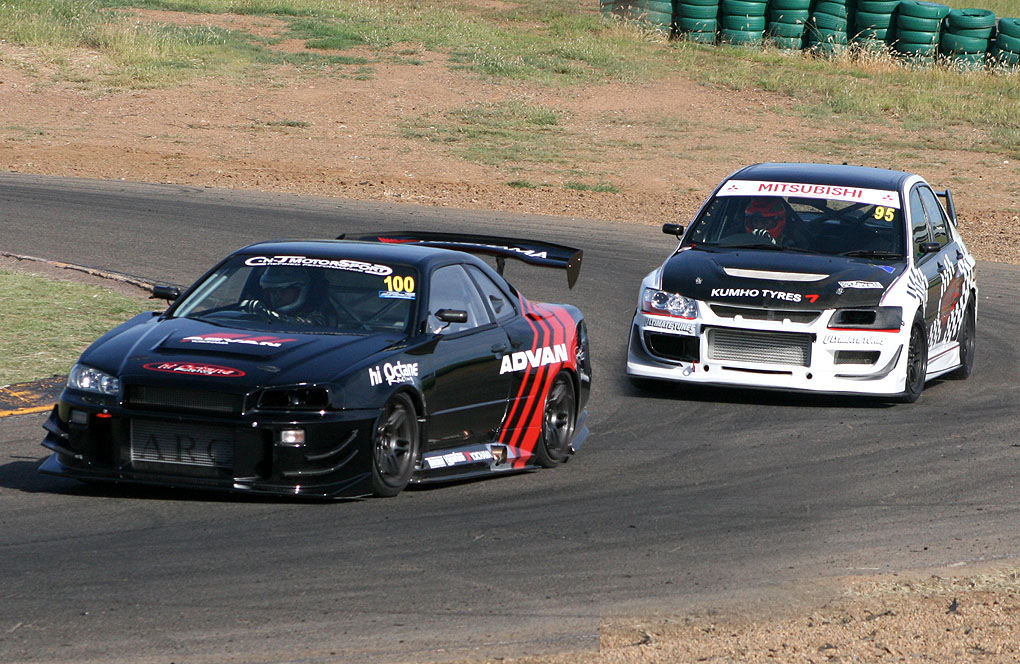
Hi Octane R34 versus Tilton Interiors EVO for the ultimate Superlap supremacy at Sydney's Oran Park, March 2009.

The Super Lap logo

Scott Kreyl attempts to retain his title at Super Lap Taupo, 2008, but retires early with mechanical difficulties.

Super Lap is a time attack motorsport event. Super Lap events are being held in Australia and New Zealand.

== Australia ==
The inaugural Superlap Australia event was held at the Oran Park Raceway in July 2008. It has since become an annual event attracting the fastest circuit cars in the country and even some overseas guests.

In Australia, Super Lap is divided into three classes: Club Sprint Class, Open Class and an invitational Pro Class The requirements for each class are described on the Superlap Australia website.

== New Zealand ==
In New Zealand, the first NZ Performance Car Super Lap was held in April 2007 at Taupo Motorsport Park. It was the first event of its kind held in New Zealand on a race circuit. Other time trial-style events have been road-based run by motoring clubs, such as rallying and bent sprints.

Super Lap is an event specially formulated as a total test of import street car performance, and is only open to JDM (Japanese domestic market) import cars. Originating in Japan—where such events are often called Tuner Battles because of competition between "tuning houses"—the style of racing has been adopted in the UK, US, and Australia.

In its New Zealand format, Super Lap is broken down into individual classes: Street Pro (PRO), Street Private (PVT) and Unlimited class (ULM). Street Pro consists of caged warranted, registered and certified cars. Street Private consists of uncaged, street-legal cars. The Unlimited class (introduced for Super Lap 2008 at Taupo Motorsport Park) allows full competition cars—those not road-registered but race-ready—to compete. Unlimited class cars are not eligible to win Super Lap.

Competitors are timed over a single flying lap of the track in a qualifying format. Competitors start from the pit lane on its out-lap. When the car crosses the start-finish line for the first time, the timer is started. The timer is stopped when the start-finish line is crossed at the end of the flying lap, and the competitor performs and in-lap, returning to the pits. The fastest ten go into a top-10 shootout in the same format. The winner of this wins the event.

In 2016 the format slightly changed and the use of a full slick tyre was banned from use in the New Zealand superlap series and will continue forward using a d.o.t semi slick tyre like the z221s by Hankook or the A050 by Yokohama for e.g. this would now align New Zealand with the rest of the world in the time attack / super lap format and continue to grow alongside the rest of the globe.

== Typical cars ==
Readily available high-performance Japanese imports are used such as: Nissan Skyline GT-R, Nissan Silvia, Nissan Pulsar GTI-R, Nissan 300ZX, Nissan 350Z, Nissan Laurel, Subaru WRX, Subaru Legacy, Mitsubishi Lancer Evolution, Honda Integra, Honda Civic, Honda S2000, Toyota Celica, Toyota Supra, Toyota Levin AE86, Toyota Altezza, Mazda RX-7, Mazda 323, Mazda RX-8.

== Results ==
=== Superlap Australia 2009 Oran Park, GP Circuit ===
For a full list of results go to

Pro Class
Pos	Team	Vehicle	Fastest lap
1	Tilton Interiors	Mitsubishi Lancer Evo IX	1:12.10
2	Advan/Hi Octane Racing	Nissan Skyline R34 GT-R	1:13.63
3	Notaras Racing	Mitsubishi Lancer Evo IX	1:14.24

Open Class
Pos	Team	Vehicle	Driver	Fastest lap
Winner	Southern Motorworks	Lotus Exige	John Boston	1:15.22
2nd	Bilstein Racing	Mazda RX-7	Ryan Brown	1:15.83
3rd	Insight Motorsports	Honda S2000	Elias Augerinos	1:16.26
Category	Team	Vehicle	Driver	Fastest lap
Fastest 4WD	Mark Rayner	Mitsubishi Lancer Evo IX	Mark Rayner	1:16.81
Fastest RWD	Southern Motorworks	Lotus Exige	John Boston	1:15.22
Fastest FWD	Pro Concept	Honda Civic	Jacky Yick	1:17.23
Fastest 4 Cylinder	Southern Motorworks	Lotus Exige	John Boston	1:15.22
Fastest 6 Cylinder	SM Motorsport	BMW M3	Sam Markov	1:16.96
Fastest 8 Cylinder	Caltex Guildford		Peter Hennesy	1:22.88
Fastest Rotary	Bilstein Racing	Mazda RX-7	Ryan Brown	1:15.83
Fastest Naturally Aspirated	Bilstein Racing	Mazda RX-7	Ryan Brown	1:15.83
Fastest Owner Driver	Bilstein Racing	Mazda RX-7	Ryan Brown	1:15.83

Clubsprint Class
Pos	Driver	Vehicle	Fastest lap
Winner	Jeramiah Thomas	Mitsubishi Lancer Evo IX	1:18.76
2nd	Jason Naidoo	Mitsubishi Lancer Evo VIII	1:19.40
3rd	Marek Tomaszewski	Mitsubishi Lancer Evo IX	1:19.58
Category	Driver	Vehicle	Fastest lap
Fastest 4WD	Jeramiah Thomas	Mitsubishi Lancer Evo IX	1:18.76
Fastest RWD	Evan McCormack	Mazda RX-7	1:24.59
Fastest FWD	Tim Ware	Honda Integra Type R	1:24.80
Fastest 4 Cylinder	Jeramiah Thomas	Mitsubishi Lancer Evo IX	1:18.76
Fastest 6 Cylinder	Bill Miller	Nissan Skyline R34 GT-R	1:22.54
Fastest 8 Cylinder	Brad Lowe	HDT Special Vehicles VE Commodore	1:24.76
Fastest Rotary	Evan McCormack	Mazda RX-7	1:24.59
Fastest Naturally Aspirated	Brad Lowe	HDT Special Vehicles VE Commodore	1:24.76

See all the lap times and full listing at Natsoft

=== 2008 Taupo (1 November) ===
This results table shows the fastest overall times of the day. Barry Manon, in third place, was the first non-Unlimited class car, and therefore claimed the Super Lap title for Taupo 2008. Defending champion Scott Kreyl retired with mechanical difficulties.

Pos	Driver	Vehicle	Top 13 Time	Shoot-Out Time	Best Time of Day
1	Grant Hohaia	Toyota Corolla	1:15.45	1:16.36	1:15.45
2	Jonothan Lester	Toyota Supra	1:16.42	DNR	1:16.42
3	Barry Manon	Toyota Levin GT-Z AE92	1:16.97	1:16.93	1:16.93
4	Ian Campbell	Mitsubishi Lancer Evolution VI	1:17.10	1:17.38	1:17.10
5	Dirk Schmidt	Mitsubishi Lancer Evolution II	1:17.17	1:17.19	1:17.17
6	Mark Walters	Honda Civic	1:17.75	1:17.62	1:17.62
7	Daynom Templeman	Mazda RX-7	1:17.84	DNR	1:17.84
8	Brendan Sole	Mazda RX-7	1:18.45	1:18.52	1:18.45
9	Kenneth Au	Nissan Silvia/200SX S15	1:18.72	1:19.72	1:18.72
10	Chris Trundle	Mazda RX-7	1:19.44	1:18.93	1:18.93

=== 2008 Pukekohe (6 April) ===
Scott Kreyl in his Mitsubishi Lancer Evolution VIII retained his Super Lap title.

Pos	Driver	Vehicle	Class	Fastest lap
1	Scott Kreyl	Mitsubishi Lancer Evo VIII	Street Pro	1:02.03
2	Garry Sutton	Nissan Skyline R33 GT-R	Street	1:02.83
3	Harry Dodson	Nissan Skyline R32 GT-R	Street Pro	1:04.63
4	Barry Manon	Toyota Levin GT-Z AE92	Street	1:04.80
5	Grant Hohaia	Toyota Levin AE86	Street Pro	1:04.86
6	Dirk Schmidt	Mitsubishi Lancer Evo II	Street	1:05.06
7	Brent Love	Mazda RX-7 FD3S	Street	1:06.58
8	Ian Campbell	Mitsubishi Lancer Evo VI	Street	1:06.74
9	Simon Turner	Mitsubishi Lancer Evo III	Street Pro	1:07.19
10	Kenneth Au	Nissan Silvia S15	Street	1:07.23

=== 2007 Taupo ===
Pos	Car #	Entrant	Vehicle	Time	Class
1	53	Scott Kreyl	Mitsubishi Lancer Evo	1:12.75	Private
2	14	Brent Ingram	Toyota Starlet GT	1:14.30	Pro
3	47	Dirk Scherbius	Mitsubishi Lancer Evo	1:14.60	Private
4	41	Ian Campbell	Mitsubishi Lancer Evo	1:14.75	Private
5	18	Victor Chapman	Nissan Silvia S13	1:14.78	Pro
6	7	Grant Hohaia	Toyota Levin	1:15.57	Pro
7	11	Jason Gill	Mitsubishi Lancer Evo	1:15.63	Pro
8	3	Harry Dodson	Nissan Skyline	1:16.71	Pro
9	49	Craig Silby	Mitsubishi Lancer Evo	1:16.94	Private
10	55	Nick Bowyer	Mitsubishi Lancer Evo	1:17.55	Private
