= Mike Whiddett =

New Zealand drifting race driver

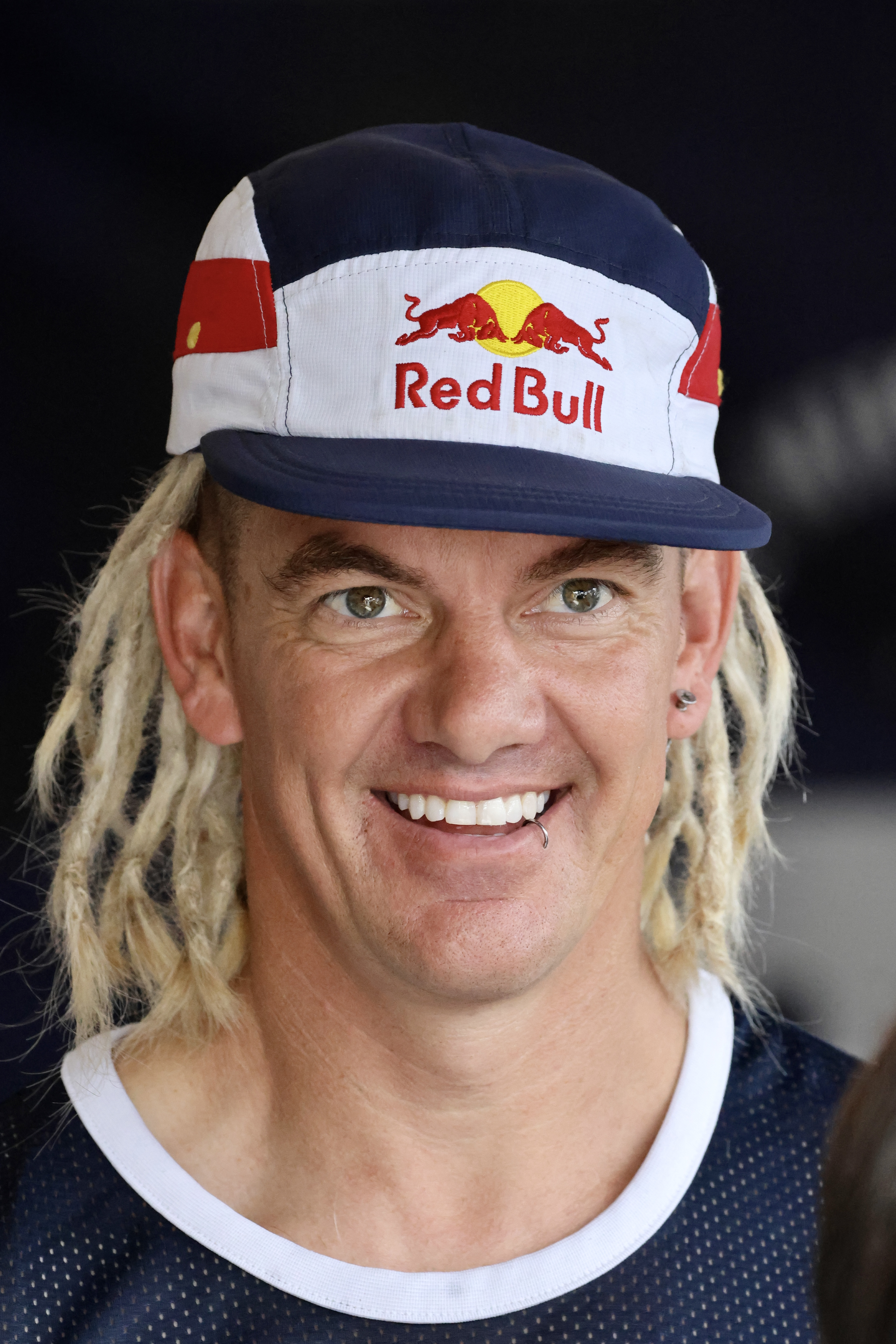
- Whiddett at the 2026 Adelaide Motorsport Festival
- Nationality: New Zealander
- Born: Michael Brandon Whiddett; 10 January 1981 (age 45) Auckland, New Zealand

Formula Drift
- Years active: 2010, 2015–2016

Previous series
- 2015: Stadium Super Trucks

Championship titles
- 2018: Formula Drift Japan Series

Michael Brandon Whiddett, (born 10 January 1981) nicknamed "Mad Mike", is a New Zealand drifting racer. He is sponsored by Red Bull. Whiddett has also raced motocross from the age of six and placed second at the New Zealand 1997 Pro junior 85cc Motocross Champs.

== Car history ==
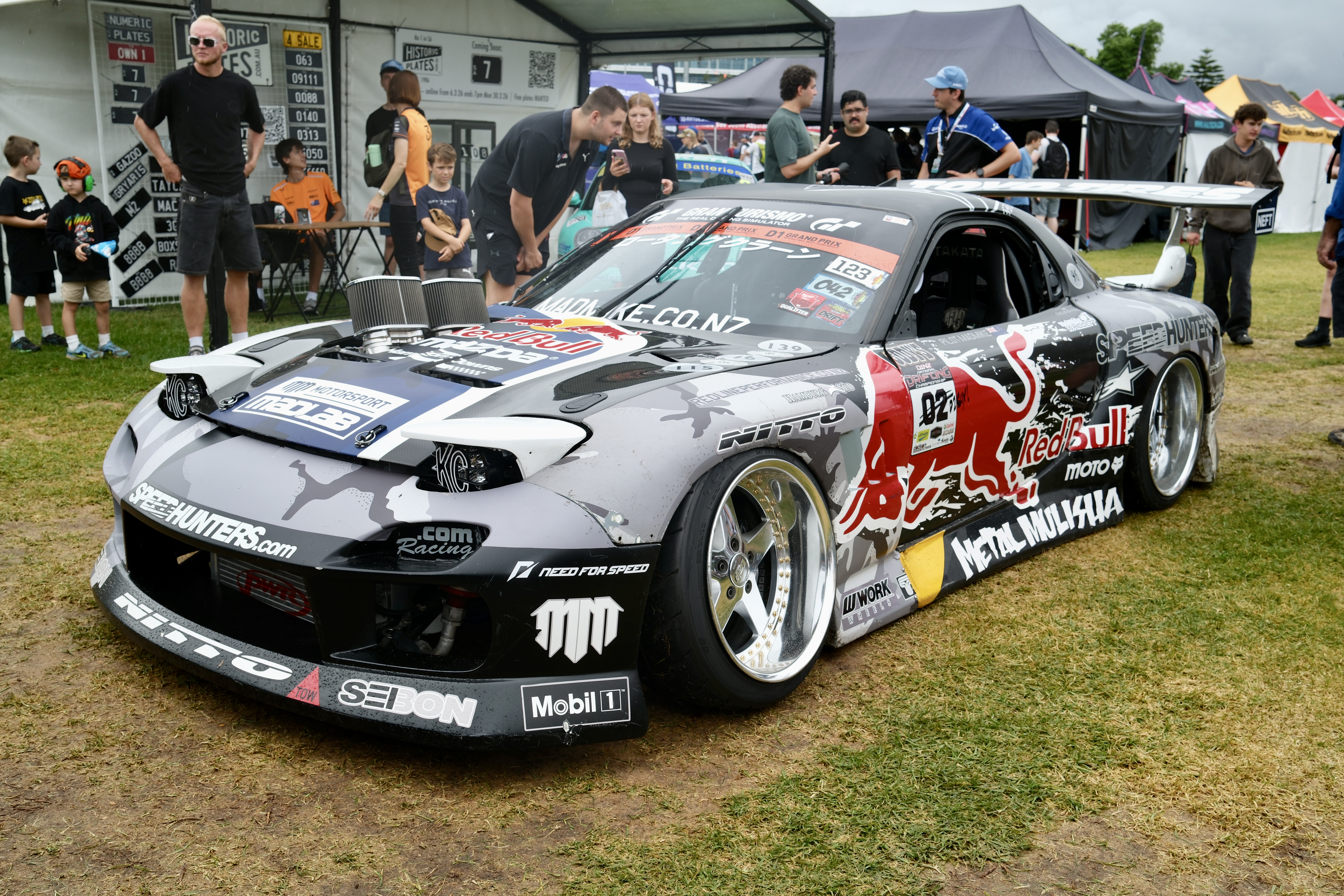
Mazda RX-7

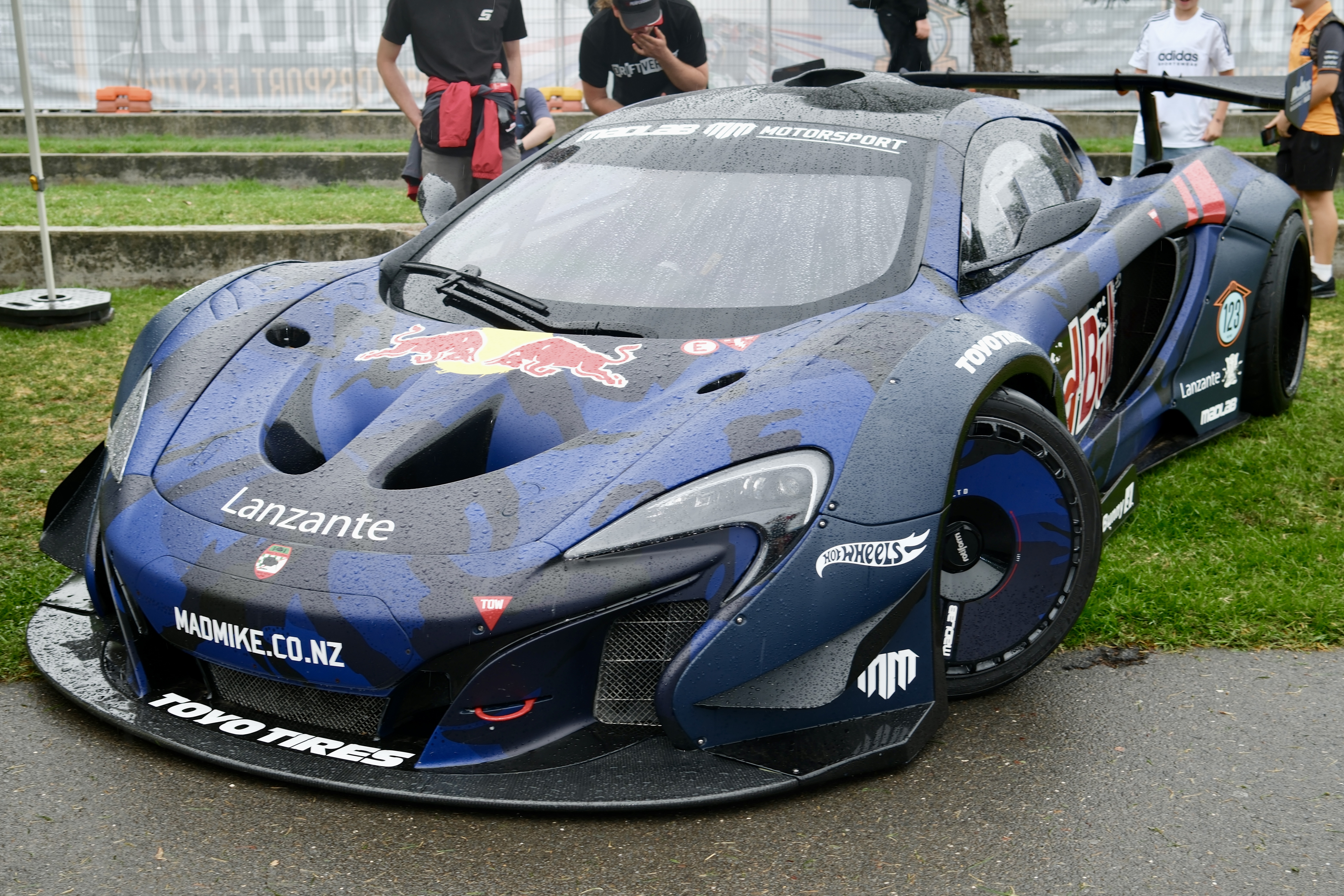
McLaren P1 GTR

Whiddett has a strong relationship with Mazda and has been drifting in Mazda engines since he started in 2007 in a Mazda RX-7. His cars have all been named in a similar way including:

- FURSTY, a Mazda 808 station wagon stated to be his first drift car
- NIMBUL, a Lamborghini Huracán with a Liberty Walk bodykit and Fi EXHAUST, makes approximately 800-900HP
- MADBUL, a Mazda FD RX-7 with a 26B quad rotor, naturally aspirated engine. MADBUL was given a new look in 2017 to have RX-3 front end bodywork and renamed MADBUL 7.3 due its design combination of RX-7 and RX-3
- BADBUL, a Mazda RX-8 with a 20B three rotor turbo engine
- HUMBUL, a Mazda FD RX-7 with a 26B quad rotor, twin turbo engine
- RADBUL, a Mazda NC MX-5 with a 26B quad rotor, twin turbo engine
- RADBUL Gen2, a Mazda NC MX-5 with ND MX-5 body panels and a 26B quad rotor, twin turbo engine
- RUMBUL, a Mazda B2000 based Stadium Truck with a naturally aspirated 13B twin rotor engine
- MADAZ 787D, a custom built drift car based on a Mazda 787B with the world's first 5 rotor engine
- MADMAC, a custom McLaren 650S with Rocket Bunny bodykit based on McLaren 650 GT3 front and McLaren P1 GTR rear, and a 20B three rotor engine
- BULLET, a 2022 Mazda3 (BP) with a 26B quad rotor engine
- FORM1DABUL, a 1987 March 87P Formula One car with a turbocharged rotary engine
- LIABUL, a 1977 Ferrari 308 GTB with a bodykit and other modifications

Whiddett also owns a Mazda REPU with a 13B twin rotor engine called PITBUL, and a Mazda Luce Sedan set up to take up to three passengers called MADCAB.

Whiddett's current project car is a 2022 Mazda 3 (BP). It will feature a quad rotor Wankel engine with 1,200 hp and is being developed to race in the famous Pikes Peak International Hill Climb in celebration of the race's 100th anniversary.

== Racing history ==
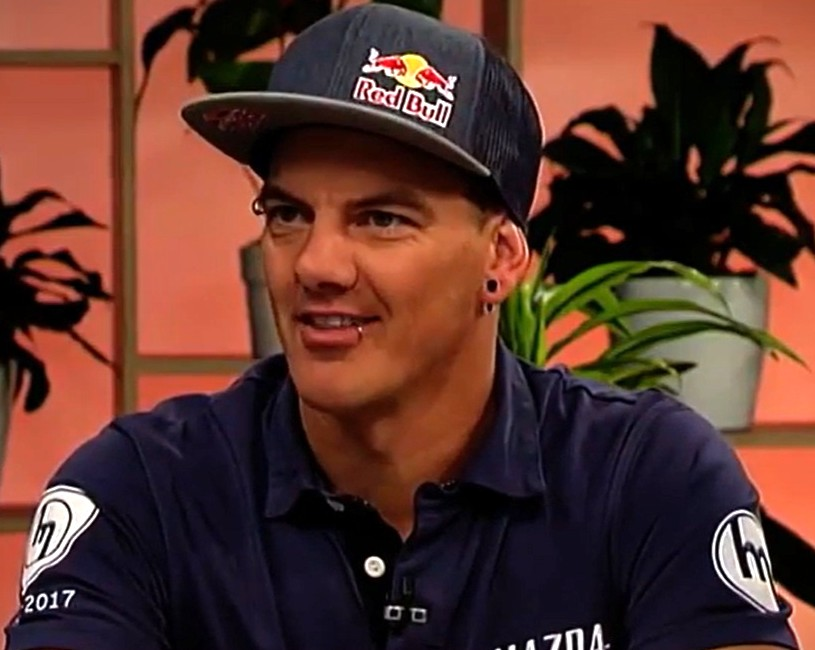
Whiddett in 2017

Whiddett has competed in Formula Drift in the United States in the 2010, 2015 and 2016 seasons and was named the Most Improved Driver for the 2010 season. He has also competed in Formula D Asia and Formula D Japan. He is the first professional Mazda driver to clench a professional drifting championship.

Whiddett has also competed in off-road racing. In 2015, he participated in the Stadium Super Trucks race at the Sand Sports Super Show, an opportunity he received after meeting series founder Robby Gordon at the Goodwood Festival of Speed. He drove E. J. Viso's No. 5 truck during the weekend, with points earned by Whiddett going to Viso in the championship. After starting second for the first race, he finished fourth; this was followed by a retirement in Race 2 with an engine problem. Although he rolled in the final race, he finished seventh.

=== 2018 – Formula Drift Japan Series ===
- Won championship

=== 2017 – Formula Drift Japan ===
- Finished 1st at Okuibuki Motorsports Park

=== 2016 – Formula Drift ===
- Finished Top 16 at Long Beach
- Finished Top 32 at Orlando Speed World
- Finished Top 16 at Atlanta
- Finished 25th at Autodrome Saint-Eustache (Lowest season finish)
- Finished Top 32 at Monroe
- Finished 8th at Texas Motor Speedway (Highest season finish)
- Finished Top 16 at Irwindale

=== 2016 – Formula Drift Japan ===
- Finished 1st at Ebisu Circuit West Course
- Finished 9th at Okayama International Circuit

=== 2015 – Formula Drift ===
- Finished Top 16 at Atlanta
- Finished Top 16 at Orlando Speed World
- Finished 14th at Monroe (Lowest season finish)
- Finished Top 16 at Texas Motor Speedway
- Finished 5th at Irwindale (Highest season finish)

=== 2014 – Formula Drift Asia ===
- Finished 21st at Fuji Speedway
- Finished 9th at Sydney Motorsport Park

=== 2013 – Formula Drift Asia ===
- Finished 9th at Calder Park Raceway

=== 2010 – Formula Drift ===
- Finished Top 32 at Road Atlanta
- Finished Top 32 at Wall Speedway
- Finished Top 32 at Evergreen Speedway
- Finished 10th at Las Vegas Motor Speedway (Highest season finish)
- Finished 29th at Infineon Raceway (Lowest season finish)
- Finished Top 16 at Toyota Speedway

=== 2009 – Formula Drift Asia ===
- Finished 1st at Wonder World Amusement Park in 2009
- Finished 3rd Malaysia Agro Exposition Park in 2009

== Achievements ==
- 2009, finished first at Wonder World Amusement Park in the Formula Drift Asia series.
- In 2014, Whiddett was the first New Zealand drift driver to receive an award from Motorsport New Zealand for outstanding achievement.
- 2015, finished fifth at Irwindale Formula Drift for his highest finish in the series.
- 2016, finished first at Okayama International Circuit in the Formula Drift Japan series.

== Motorsports career results ==
=== Stadium Super Trucks ===
(key) (Bold – Pole position. Italics – Fastest qualifier. * – Most laps led.)

Stadium Super Trucks results
Year	1	2	3	4	5	6	7	8	9	10	11	12	13	14	15	16	17	18	19	20	21	22	SSTC	Pts	Ref
2015	ADE	ADE	ADE	STP	STP	LBH	DET	DET	DET	AUS	TOR	TOR	OCF; 4^{†}	OCF; 10^{†}	OCF; 7^{†}	SRF	SRF	SRF	SRF	SYD	LVV	LVV	38th	0	
† – Replaced E. J. Viso, points went to Viso
