= ASL Garaiya =

Japanese concept sports car

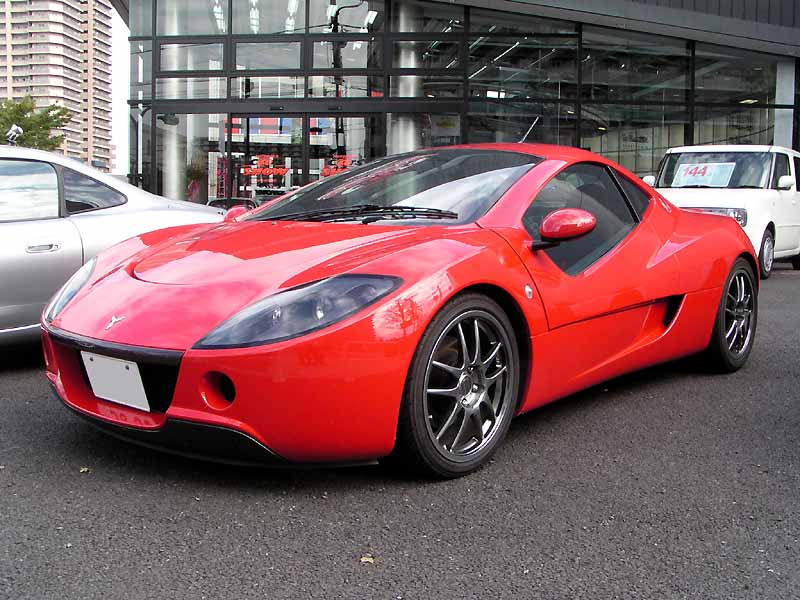

Overview
- Manufacturer: Autobacs Sportscar Laboratory
- Also called: ASL Graiya; Autobacs Garaiya
- Production: 2002 (concept only)
- Assembly: Norwich, England
- Designer: Noriyuki Nishida

Body and chassis
- Class: Sports car
- Body style: 2-door coupe
- Layout: Rear mid-engine, rear-wheel drive
- Doors: Scissor

Powertrain
- Engine: 2.0 L SR20VE I4 NEO VVL
- Power output: 204 PS (150 kW; 201 hp)
- Transmission: 6-speed manual

Dimensions
- Wheelbase: 2,375 mm (93.5 in)
- Length: 3,775 mm (148.6 in)
- Width: 1,825 mm (71.9 in)
- Height: 1,185 mm (46.7 in)
- Curb weight: 800 kg (1,800 lb)

The ASL Garaiya (Japanese: ASL・ガライヤ, Hepburn: ASL Garaiya) is a mid-engined concept sports car developed by ASL, the car manufacturing arm of Autobacs Seven.

== History ==
Autobacs Seven first announced the Garaiya on 4 December 2001 as their first sports car offering. The car's name apparently comes from that of a thief from the Ming dynasty who shared his stolen wares with those who were less well off. The car was styled by Noriyuki Nishida and engineered by Kikuo Kaira, known for his work on the Tommykaira ZZ.

The Garaiya was first shown off to the public at the 2002 Tokyo Auto Salon, alongside the ASL RS01. The Garaiya was set to enter production in fall 2002 with a planned production volume of 100 cars a year at a price of ¥6,500,000 each.

A showroom specifically to sell the Garaiya was set up in Kita-Aoyama, Tokyo in 2002. At least 60 backorders were placed, although it is likely some were for speculative purposes. There were apparently some issues with development of the Garaiya, and as a result ASL decided to cancel sales of the Garaiya in the summer of 2005 after only a few prototypes were built. The finished vehicles would then be given to various Autobacs Seven employees, exhibited at various Autobacs stores or sold to other companies; one prototype vehicle would be sold to Osaka Sangyo University where it would be converted into an electric vehicle.

== Specifications ==
The Garaiya was intended to be manufactured in England, similar to the Tommykaira ZZ; the few prototypes produced were manufactured in Norwich.

The Garaiya features an all-aluminium construction and dual scissor doors. The car is powered by a Nissan SR20VE inline-four engine mated to a 6-speed manual transmission; the car is designed with a rear mid-engine, rear-wheel drive layout. The taillights and door mirrors are reused from the Alfa Romeo 147.

The vehicle body itself was essentially custom-made; Autobacs stated that it was possible for them to do bespoke orders. Customers would take part in the final development of their car's suspension to tailor it to their preferences or driving style. An early concept for the Garaiya's order process required prospective buyers to do a written and practical test and a conducted interview, with those passing the tests given the opportunity to buy the Garaiya; the vehicle's ultimate cancelation ended these plans.

== Motorsports ==
ASL ARTA Garaiya
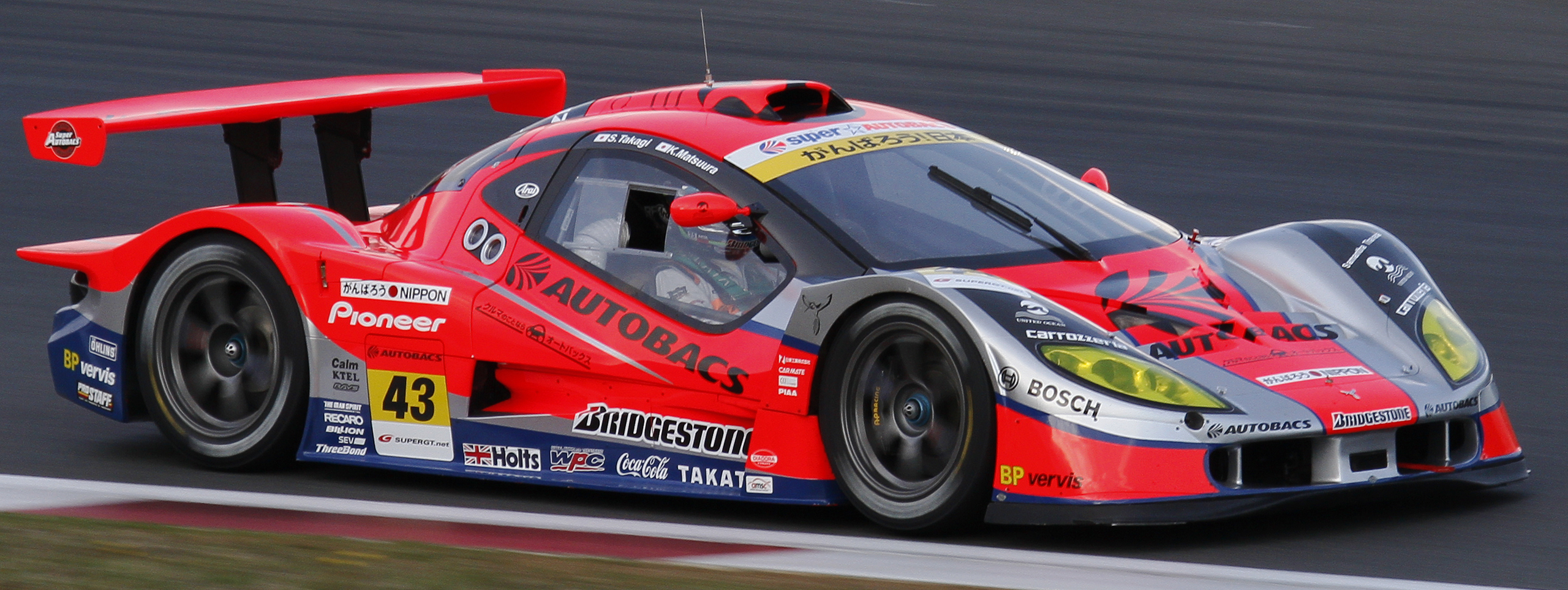
- Category: Super GT GT300
- Constructor: Autobacs Racing Team Aguri (ASL)

Technical specifications
- Chassis: Hybrid steel aluminum
- Suspension (front): Double wishbone
- Suspension (rear): Same as front
- Length: 4,544 mm (178.9 in)
- Width: 1,935 mm (76.2 in)
- Height: 1,051 mm (41.4 in)
- Engine: Nissan SR20DET 2,000 cc I4, turbocharged (2003); Nissan VQ35DE 3,497 cc V6, naturally aspirated (2004–2005, 2007–2012) Mid-engined, longitudinally mounted
- Transmission: Hewland 6-speed sequential manual
- Power: Over 300 ps @ 7000 rpm
- Weight: 1,260 kg (2,778 lb)
- Tyres: BF Goodrich 285/35ZR18 front, 285/35ZR20 rear (2003–2004); Michelin (2005–2010); Bridgestone (2011–2012)

Competition history
- Notable entrants: Autobacs Racing Team Aguri
- Notable drivers: (Japan) Shinichi Takagi; (Japan) Morio Nitta; (Japan) Kyosuke Mineo; (Japan) Kosuke Matsuura
- Debut: 2003 GT Championship in TI
- Last season: 2012
Races	Wins	Poles	F/Laps
77	7	9	6
- Constructors' Championships: 0
- Drivers' Championships: 0

Autobacs Racing Team Aguri entered the Garaiya into the All Japan Grand Touring Car Championship in 2003, replacing their previous Toyota MR-S which had been competing since 2000; veteran drivers Morio Nitta and Shinichi Takagi, the drivers of the team's previous MR-S race car for the last three seasons, were retained to drive the Garaiya. The car's powerplant was a Mid West Racing-tuned Nissan SR20DET 2.0 L turbocharged I4 and ran using BF Goodrich tyres. The car's small size and light weight contributed to the car's performance, allowing it to score a fastest lap and a podium; however, its straight line speed was notably lacking. The team finished fifth at the end of the season.

ARTA continued their Garaiya program for 2004, this time switching out the SR20DET for an Ogura-tuned 3.5 L VQ35DE V6 from the Nissan Fairlady Z for increased power. This increase in power solved the car's straight line speed issues and resulted in the Garaiya's first win at the Hokkaido Gran GT Championship in July 2004; the Garaiya finished second in the team's championship, losing to the M-Tec Honda NSX by a single point. Starting from this year, the Garaiya began to be used in corporate commercials for ARTA, as well as appearing in various television shows and video games. The Garaiya, now using Michelin tires, continued to be used in 2005 in the series, now known as Super GT, but an ultimatum was given by Aguri Suzuki, stating that the team would be closed if they failed to become champion; despite winning Sepang, engine troubles dogged the team in the final race, dropping them to third in the championship due to a non-scoring race, with Suzuki closing the team as a result. Due to this, the Garaiya would not compete in 2006, with the car displayed in an Autobacs store in France; both Nitta and Takagi would be called upon by apr, who ran the GT300 operations of ARTA, to drive their #101 Toy Story-branded MR-S. There would also be no showing of the Garaiya at the 2006 and 2007 Tokyo Auto Salon.

To commemorate ARTA's 10th anniversary, the GT300 team was reopened, with Nitta and Takagi called back to drive the Garaiya. The car, at the time in France, was quickly shipped back to Japan and modified to comply with the regulations; the vehicle showed pace at the pre-season tests but quickly faded in pace, although the Garaiya did win the May Fuji race. The team finished 4th in the standings that year. ARTA continued running the Garaiya for 2008 and 2009 with the same driver lineup but with a new chassis design, picking up three more wins; the Garaiya's win at the 2009 May Fuji race would be the last win for the car. For 2010, the Garaiya was in a close fight with the #3 Hasemi Motorsport Nissan Fairlady Z for the championship, but a non-score in the final round of the championship in Motegi caused them to lose the championship to the #3 car by nine points, despite consistent point finishes and three podium finishes up to that point.

2011 saw the Garaiya's tyre supplier changed to Bridgestone and Kosuke Matsuura stepping into the team to replace Nitta, who moved to the main apr team. The team finished 12th in the championship with 26 points with a best result of third. The Garaiya program was intended to be discontinued after 2011, although in 2012 ARTA announced they would continue the program for another year. With a best finish of 5th, the Garaiya finished the 2012 season in 9th place in the standings.

Changes to the Super GT rule structure were enacted in 2012 to take effect the next season; this would lead to the phasing out of JAF-GT Category C and D vehicles from competition, categories spanning prototype sports cars based on modified sports cars with few or no road-going counterparts. As a result of the rule changes, the Garaiya is no longer able to race in the series. To commemorate the Garaiya's retirement, ARTA held a small ceremony at what would be the Garaiya's last race. The Garaiya competed in 77 races, achieving 7 wins, 13 second places and 5 third places; ARTA never won a championship with the Garaiya, finishing runner-up in the championship three times. The car was replaced by the Honda CR-Z GT for the 2013 season.
