= Tommykaira =

Japanese car tuning company

Tommykaira Tomita Yume Hanbai
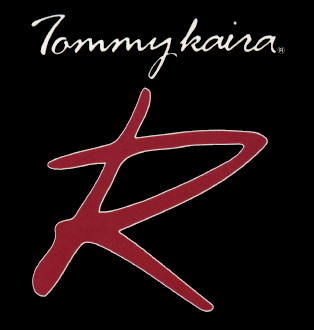
- Type: Public
- Industry: Specialty Car tuning and Automobile manufacturing
- Founded: Tomita Auto Inc (1968–1973); Tomita Auto Co Ltd (1973–1996); Tomita Yume Koujou (1996–2002); Tomita Yume Hanbai (2001–2007); M-Direction (2007–2009); TOMMYKAIRA (2009–2013); Tommykaira (2013–present)
- Founder: Yoshikazu Tomita and Kikuo Kaira
- Headquarters: Minami-ku, Kyoto, Japan
- Products: Sports cars; Car tuning services; High-performance automobile parts; High-performance automobile accessories
- Website: www.tommykaira.club (English)

Tommykaira (トミーカイラ), originally founded as Tomita Yume Koujou (トミタ夢工場株式会社), is a Japanese car tuning and manufacturing company founded in 1986 and headquartered in Minami-ku, Kyoto, Japan. The company was named after its two founders, Yoshikazu Tomita and Kikuo Kaira. Its parent company was founded in 1968 as Tomita Auto Inc. (トミタオート株式会社). Several of Tommykaira's custom cars have appeared in the Gran Turismo and Forza Motorsport racing simulation video game series.

== Car tuning ==
The Tommykaira signature, which identifies the cars tuned by the company

In 1987, Tommykaira unveiled a tuned Mercedes-Benz 190E which was renamed as the "Tommykaira M19". The company subsequently released the M30E, which was based on the Mercedes-Benz 300E. However, from 1988 onwards, Tommykaira began to exclusively work on automobiles made in Japan, establishing successful contracts with manufacturers Nissan and Subaru. In 1988, the company tuned for the first time a Nissan Skyline R31 (rebranded as Tommykaira M30), in 1993, the turn was for the Subaru Impreza (M20b) and the Nissan March (m13) and, finally, in 1994, the first Subaru Legacy Wagon (M20tb) received attention from the Kyoto-based company. The company focused most of its efforts on mechanical and aesthetic modifications to four cars- the Nissan Skyline, Nissan March, Subaru Impreza and Subaru Legacy.

Other models modified have included the Nissan 300ZX, Nissan Silvia, Nissan GTR R35, Toyota Vitz, Nissan 350Z and several kei cars from various manufacturers. Tommykaira has consistently rebranded the cars as if they were completely manufactured by the company itself, with the consent of the parent manufacturers: for example, a Subaru Impreza is rebranded as Tommykaira M20b or a Nissan 350Z as a Tommykaira Z. This phenomenon is not unusual around the world, as German manufacturers such as Ruf and Gemballa operate in a similar way with Porsche automobiles.

On the other hand, the rebranding process carried out by Tommykaira has evoked some controversy directly related to the status of the company as a car manufacturer. According to the information spot provided by the PlayStation video game Gran Turismo 2 about the Kyoto-based company, "in 1988, [Tommykaira] succeeded in introducing Tommy Kaira M30, Japan's first fully modified high performance car [...][while] in 1997, [it] manufactured and marketed its original sports car, the ZZ". This acknowledged the capability of Tommykaira as an important aftermarket manufacturer and prepared the way for the launch of the company as a consolidated car manufacturer with the self-conceived 1996 ZZ model.

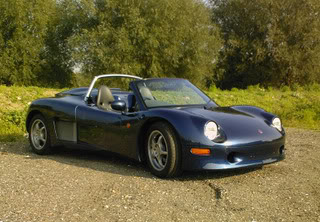
A Tommykaira ZZ

== ZZ Car manufacturing and economic crisis ==
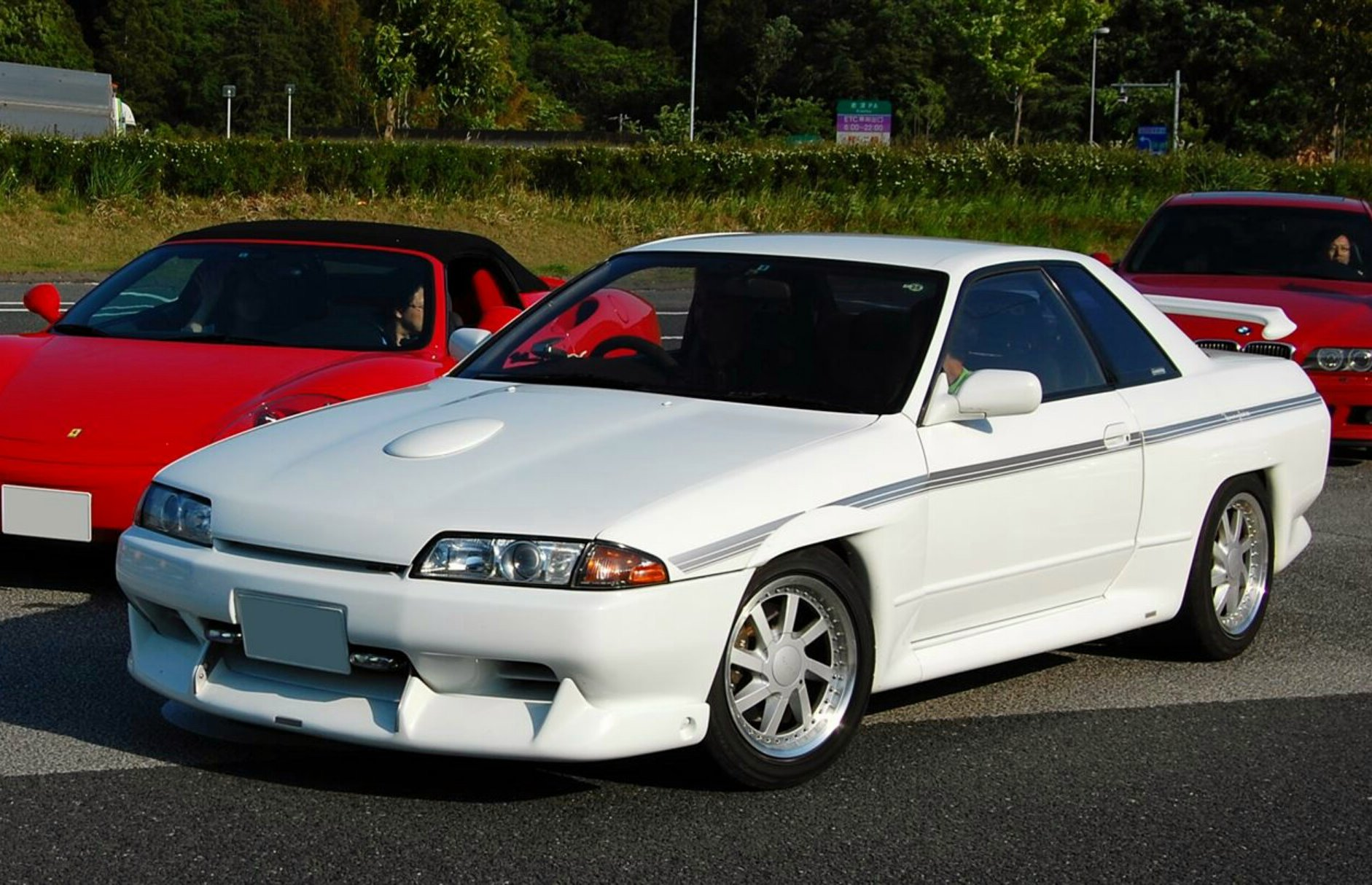
The Tommykaira M30, based on the R32 Skyline GTS-t

By 1996, Tommykaira had solely modified pre-existing models manufactured by Nissan and Subaru; nonetheless, the heavy improvements worked out by the company on the cars made it gain recognition as a brand in its own right.

The company decided to develop its own original design, the ZZ. The ZZ was produced in Ironside way, Hingham, Norfolk, England, but the factory that manufactured the ZZ collapsed due to a blunder of the Japanese Ministry of Transportation which, in 1999, switched front impact requirements from European to US standards. In 2002, the car was relaunched as the Leading Edge 190 RT built by Breckland Technologies.

== Rowen collaboration ==
At the height of the economic crisis in 2008, Tommykaira agreed on a partnership with Rowen to make parts under the Tommykaira brand. One stipulation was that all designs must be cleared by Tommykaira brand owner, Mr. Tomita, before Rowen could sell the products. From early-on, the agreement was breached when Rowen unilaterally capitalized the name "Tommykaira" as "TOMMYKAIRA". This was found to be one of many violations cited in court and led to the breakup of Tommykaira's collaboration with Rowen. Despite losing in court, Rowen continued to sell and produce Tommykaira branded products well beyond the court decision leading to an abundance of unauthorized Tommykaira products with the logo being in all-caps.

== Regaining independence ==
By around 2015, the dispute with Rowen had ended and the Tommykaira brand (managed by then, Threeek's CEO Mr. Tokitake) was once again independent. In a chance meeting with JDM Parts Ninja (formerly Japan Auction Parts) co-founder, Mike Wyckoff, Tommykaira once again began producing and selling products for both domestic and overseas markets.

Tommykaira brand license holder, Threeek, rebranded to GTS (Genuine Tommykaira Studio) in 2017 and sells Tommykaira brand products in Japan. JDM Parts Ninja is the exclusive distributor of the Tommykaira brand abroad.

== Club international launch ==
Club Logo

In 2020, at the height of the COVID-19 pandemic, with a dwindling number of Tommykaira car owners in Japan, local chapters were disbanded in favour of a global subscription club called "Tommykaira Club International". The brainchild of Mike Wyckoff and GTS, the club, also known as TKCI, celebrated its launch in fall of 2020 and official first-year membership was 2021. The cost of a yearly membership starts at $88.

The logo was decided upon in 2020 by a group of Tommykaira enthusiasts that were asked to vote for their favourite Japanese kanji character from among a list of 5. The kanji is read "tamashi" and means "spirit" as in "Racing Spirit".

== Models ==
(Please take note that for almost all models engine tuning was offered only as an optional and that some models also had more tuning stages available; shown here are the maximum performances available for each car.)

- 1987
  - M19 (Mercedes-Benz W201) - I4 1996cc SOHC, 153 PS / 188 N⋅m
  - M30E (Mercedes-Benz W124) - I6 2960cc SOHC, 225 PS / 279 N⋅m
- 1988
  - M30 (Nissan Skyline R31 coupé) - I6 3000cc DOHC, 240 PS / 294 N⋅m
  - M20 (Nissan Skyline R31 coupé) - I6 1998cc DOHC turbo, 220 PS / 255 N⋅m
- 1989
  - M18Si NA (Nissan Silvia S13) - I4 1809cc DOHC, 150 PS / 177 N⋅m
  - M18Si/Si R (Nissan Silvia S13) - I4 1809cc DOHC turbo, 205 PS / 240 N⋅m
  - M30C (Nissan Cima Y31) - V6 2960cc DOHC turbo, 280 PS / 392 N⋅m
  - M30 (Nissan Skyline R32 coupé) - I6 3030cc DOHC, 280 PS / 294 N⋅m
  - M20 (Nissan Skyline R32 coupé) - I6 1998cc DOHC turbo, 250 PS / 275 N⋅m
  - M30Z (Nissan Fairlady Z32) - V6 2960cc DOHC turbo, 350 PS / 456 N⋅m
- 1991
  - M30 MC (Nissan Skyline R32 coupé) - I6 3030cc DOHC, 280 PS / 294 N⋅m
  - M20 MC (Nissan Skyline R32 coupé) - I6 1998cc DOHC turbo, 250 PS / 275 N⋅m
- 1992
  - M20t (Nissan Primera P10) - I4 1998cc DOHC, 175 PS / 196 N⋅m
  - M20Si NA (Nissan Silvia S13) - I4 1998cc DOHC, 175 PS / 196 N⋅m
  - M20Si/Si R (Nissan Silvia S13) - I4 1998cc DOHC turbo, 235 PS / 289 N⋅m
  - R/R Sport (Nissan Skyline GT-R R32) - I6 2568cc DOHC turbo, 350 PS / 353 N⋅m
- 1993
  - M20b (Subaru Impreza WRX GC8 sedan) - Flat-4 1994cc DOHC turbo, 265 PS / 329 N⋅m
  - m13 (Nissan March K11) - I4 1300cc DOHC, 90 PS / 113 N⋅m
- 1994
  - M25 (Nissan Skyline R33 coupé) - I6 2498cc DOHC turbo, 330 PS / 400 N⋅m
  - M20b Wagon (Subaru Impreza WRX GF8 wagon) - Flat-4 1994cc DOHC turbo, 265 PS / 329 N⋅m
  - M20tb (Subaru Legacy BG5 wagon) - Flat-4 1994cc DOHC turbo, 270 PS / 322
- 1995
  - R (Nissan Skyline GT-R R33) - I6 2568cc DOHC turbo, 400 PS / 420 N⋅m
  - m13 Blister Version (Nissan March K11) - I4 1300cc DOHC, 90 PS / 113 N⋅m
  - M20b MC (Subaru Impreza WRX GC8 sedan) - Flat-4 1994cc DOHC turbo, 265 PS / 329 N⋅m
  - M20tb MC (Subaru Legacy BG5 wagon) - Flat-4 1994cc DOHC turbo, 270 PS / 322
  - Tommykaira ZZ - I4 1998cc DOHC, 195 PS / 196 N⋅m
- 1997
  - M20fb (Subaru Forester SF5) - Flat-4 1994cc DOHC turbo, 295 PS / 380 N⋅m
  - M25tw (Nissan Stagea WC34) - I6 2498cc DOHC turbo, 280 PS / 305 N⋅m
  - M20b Wagon MC (Subaru Impreza WRX GF8 wagon) - Flat-4 1994cc DOHC turbo, 265 PS / 329 N⋅m
- 1998
  - 25R (Nissan Skyline R34 coupé) - I6 2498cc DOHC turbo, 300 PS / 363 N⋅m
  - m13c (Nissan Cube Z10) - I4 1300cc DOHC, 96 PS / 127 N⋅m
  - tb (Subaru Legacy BH5 wagon) - Flat-4 1994cc DOHC turbo, 295 PS / 346 N⋅m
  - B4 (Subaru Legacy B4 BE5 sedan) - Flat-4 1994cc DOHC turbo, 295 PS / 346 N⋅m
- 1999
  - R/R-s/R-z (Nissan Skyline GT-R R34) - I6 2700cc DOHC turbo, 530 PS / 534 N⋅m
- 2000
  - m13/m13 Blister Version (Nissan March K11) - I4 1300cc DOHC, 90 PS / 113 N⋅m
  - tb-2.2 (Subaru Legacy BH5 wagon) - Flat-4 2149cc DOHC turbo, 315 PS / 394 N⋅m
  - B4-2.2 (Subaru Legacy B4 BE5 sedan) - Flat-4 2149cc DOHC turbo, 315 PS / 394 N⋅m
  - P-tune (Subaru Pleo RA1/2) - I4 658cc DOHC supercharged, 83 PS / 105 N⋅m
- 2001
  - M20b-2.2 (Subaru Impreza WRX STi GDB sedan) - Flat-4 2149cc DOHC turbo, 355 PS / 441 N⋅m
  - Baby Gang (Toyota Vitz XP10) - I4 1496cc DOHC, 109 PS / 142 N⋅m
  - Boxy (Toyota Voxy R60) - I4 1994cc DOHC, no tuning
- 2002
  - m13 (Nissan March K12) - I4 1240cc DOHC, 105 PS / 140 N⋅m
  - Z (Nissan Fairlady Z33) - V6 3496cc DOHC, 304 PS / 397 N⋅m
  - tb6 (Subaru Legacy GT30 BHE wagon) - Flat-6 2999cc DOHC, 270 PS / 341 N⋅m
  - B6 (Subaru Legacy B4 BEE RS30 sedan) - Flat-6 2999cc DOHC, 270 PS / 341 N⋅m
  - fb-2.2 (Subaru Forester SG5) - Flat-4 2149cc DOHC turbo, 283 PS / 394 N⋅m
  - ist (Toyota IST XP60) - I4 1496cc DOHC supercharged, 140 PS / 174 N⋅m
  - wR (Suzuki Wagon R M12S) - I4 658cc DOHC turbo, 70 PS / 99 N⋅m
- 2003
  - tb (Subaru Legacy BP5 wagon) - Flat-4 1994cc DOHC turbo, 296 PS / 346 N⋅m
  - B4 (Subaru Legacy B4 BL5 sedan) - Flat-4 1994cc DOHC turbo, 296 PS / 346 N⋅m
  - Z Type-II (Nissan Fairlady Z33) - V6 3496cc DOHC, 304 PS / 397 N⋅m
  - Cruze (Chevrolet Cruze HR52S) - I4 1328cc DOHC, no tuning
- 2004
  - m08 (Chevrolet Matiz M150) - I3 796cc SOHC, 70 PS / 93 N.m
  - tb 220 Sport (Subaru Legacy BP5 wagon) - Flat-4 2147cc DOHC turbo, 315 PS / 378 N⋅m
  - B4 220 Sport (Subaru Legacy B4 BL5 sedan) - Flat-4 2147cc DOHC turbo, 315 PS / 378 N⋅m
  - Z Type-III (Nissan Fairlady Z33) - V6 3496cc DOHC, 320 PS / 402 N⋅m
  - M20b (Subaru Impreza WRX STi GDB/F sedan/wagon) - Flat-4 1994cc DOHC turbo
- 2007
  - GT (Nissan Skyline V36 sedan) - V6 2496cc & 3503cc DOHC, no tuning
  - S-Ss (Suzuki Swift Sport ZC31S) - I4 1586cc DOHC, no tuning
- 2018
  - R Concept (Nissan GT-R R35) - V6 3799cc DOHC turbo, no tuning
  - m14 (Suzuki Swift Sport ZC33S - I4 1373cc DOHC turbo, 193 PS / 299 N.m

== Prototypes and production figures ==
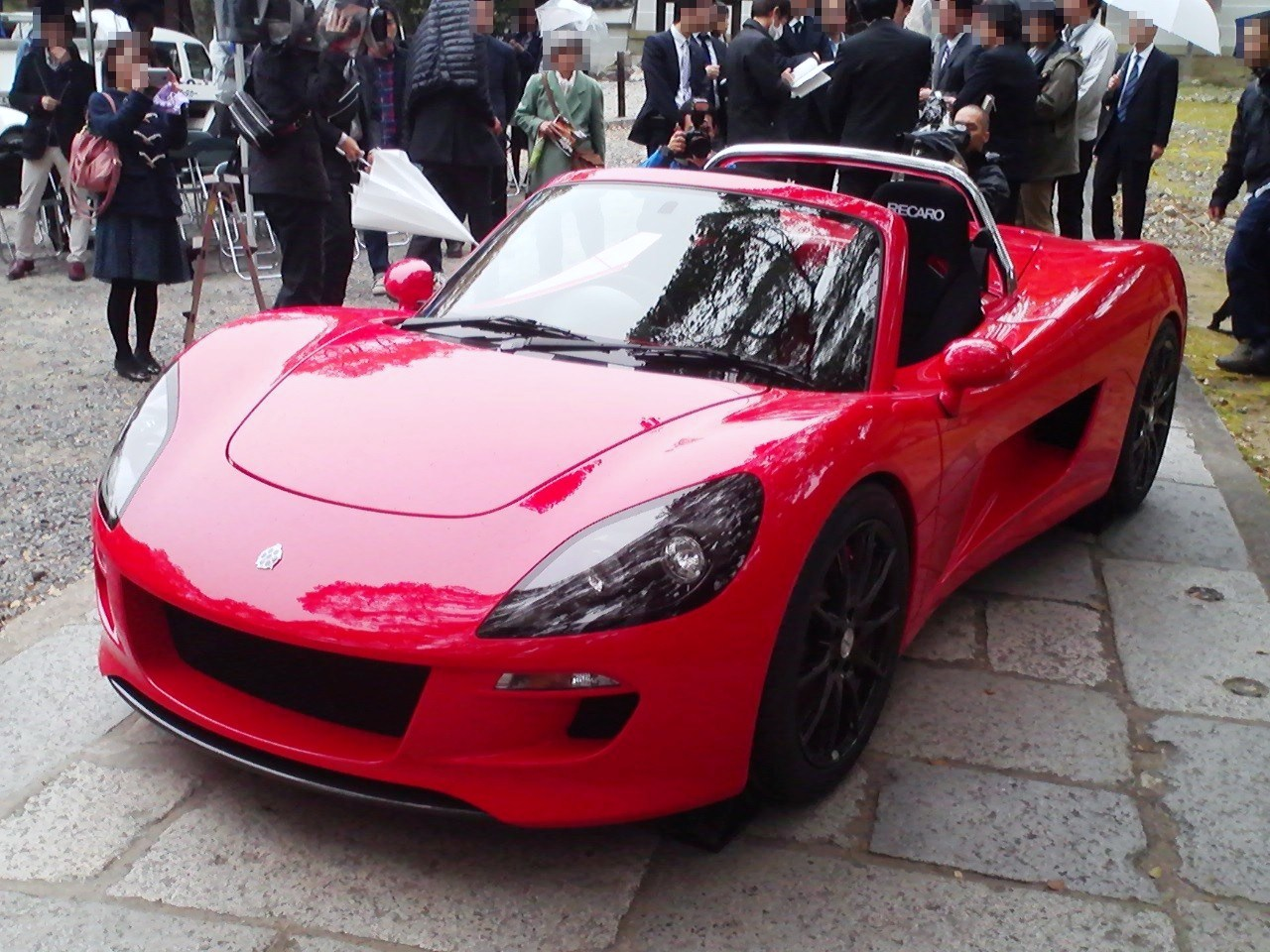
The Tommykaira ZZ, EV model.

- ZZ-S (enhanced version of ZZ)
- ZZII ($90,000 RB26DETT-powered sports car)
- ZZIII (planned modernized version of ZZ)
- Legacy BH5 tb (total est.100-200 units produced)
- Impreza GC8/GF8 M20b (approximately 105 units produced, actual production number is unknown, TK105 is the highest verified badge number, by Tommy Kaira Club International, of this model)
- R32 R & R32 RL (total of 95 units produced)
- R32 M20 (total est.100-200 units produced)
- R32 M30 (total of 20 units produced)
- R33 R & RL (total of 50 units produced)
- R33 M25 (total of 400 units produced)
- R34 R, R-S & R-Z (total of 35 units produced)
- R34 25R (total of 199 units produced 2dr + 5dr)
- GT-R R35 Tommykaira Edition (debuted at Thailand Auto Show 2018)

=== Built under Rowen ===
The following cars were built under Rowen's short-lived partnership with Tommykaira.

- GT-R R35 Silver Wolf Edition
- Toyota ist NCP61
