= Tommykaira ZZ =

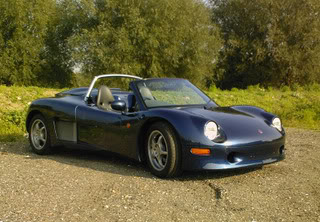
- A first-generation Tommykaira ZZ with the detachable roof removed

Overview
- Manufacturer: Tommykaira; Green Lord Motors (2nd gen)
- Also called: Tommykaira ZZ1; Tommykaira ZZI; Tommykaira ZZ-EV
- Production: 1996–2000; 2014–2021
- Designer: Takuya Yura

Body and chassis
- Class: Sports car (S)
- Body style: 2-door targa (1st gen); 2-door roadster (2nd gen)
- Layout: MR layout
- Related: Leading Edge 190 RT; Leading Edge 240 RT

Powertrain
- Engine: 2.0 L SR20DS I4 (1st gen)
- Transmission: 5-speed manual

Dimensions
- Wheelbase: 2,375 mm (94 in)
- Length: 3,630 mm (143 in)
- Width: 1,740 mm (69 in)
- Height: 1,110 mm (44 in)
- Curb weight: 650 kg (1,433 lb) (1st gen)

The Tommykaira ZZ is a mid-engined sports car manufactured by Japanese tuning company Tommykaira. The car was conceived in late 1991, developed from 1992, unveiled in 1995, and manufactured from 1996 to 2000 in its first generation, and from 2014 to 2021 in its second.

== First generation (1996–2000) ==
The first-generation ZZ used an original design by Tommykaira and Mooncraft's Takuya Yura. The roof of the car was detachable, with four bolts securing it to the roll hoop and windscreen frame. The ZZ was produced in the United Kingdom by Tomita Auto UK, and sold a total of almost 220 units in its production run.

The car was powered by a naturally-aspirated 2.0-liter SR20DE inline-four engine sourced from Nissan. Fed by four 45 mm Keihin carburetors, it sent 178 hp (133 kW; 180 PS) and 195 Nm of torque to the rear wheels via a 5-speed manual transmission, with an update in 2000 increasing its power and torque by 5 hp (4 kW; 5 PS) and 5 Nm. The ZZ was capable of a 0-100 time of approximately 4.0 seconds and a top speed of 241 km/h (150 mph). The front and rear brake discs were both vented. Tires were initially 205 mm (8.1 in) wide all around, but for later models, 195 mm (7.7 in) front tires were adopted to reduce lift-off oversteer.

=== ZZ-S ===
The ZZ-S was intended to be a sportier version of the ZZ. Its power output was slightly increased to a total of 197 hp (147 kW; 200 PS). No other changes were made.

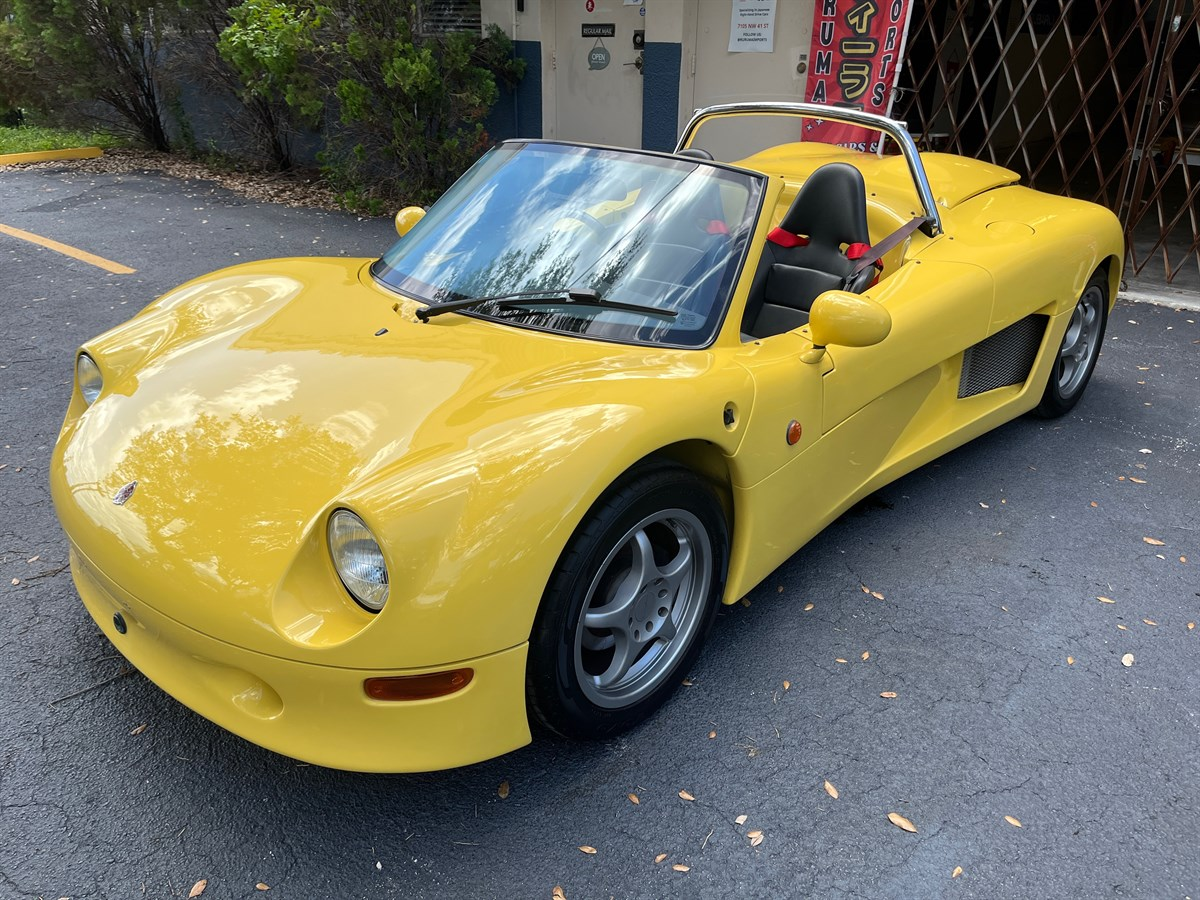
Tommykaira ZZ-S in Yellow

=== Production by Leading Edge ===
After Tomita Auto UK was dissolved, their designs were sold at auction to Breckland Technologies, who created the Leading Edge Sportscar Company to market a slightly revised ZZ from 2002 to 2005 as the Leading Edge 190 RT and 240 RT. It used Mikuni carburetors in place of the original ZZ's Keihin carburetors. When Leading Edge folded in 2005, their assets were bought at an auction by a car collector from Pakistan, who also owns a 240 RT.

== Second generation (2014–2021) ==
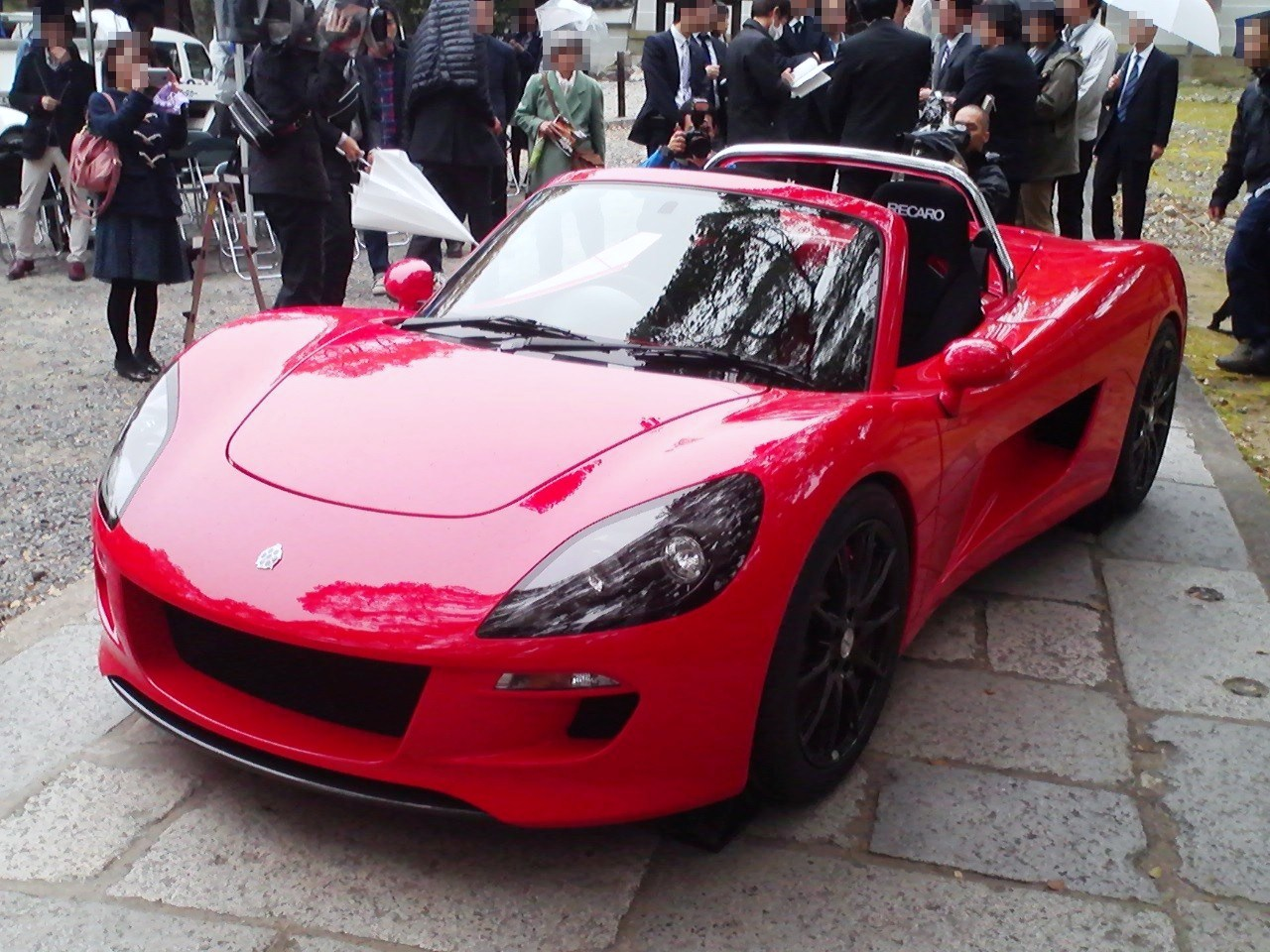
A second-generation ZZ

Tommykaira returned with another production run of the ZZ, this time with the help of a company that originated from Kyoto University called GLM (originally Green Lord Motors). A few other companies provided funding for the second-generation ZZ, including Mitsubishi UFJ Capital and Globis Capital Partners. Funding began in 2010, with a total of $6.6 million reached at the end of 2012 and another $6 million accrued from 2013 through 2015. A total of $14 million in funding was reached.

Unlike the first-generation car, the restyled second-generation ZZ, retailing for $80,000, uses an electric powertrain. Because of this change, many critics referred to it as the ZZ-EV. According to GLM, the car's chassis is "adaptable", implying an ability to withstand modifications that exceed factory performance. The electric motor produces 305 hp (227 kW; 309 PS), and the battery has a range of 121 km (75 mi). The second-generation ZZ reaches 0–60 mph (0–97 km/h) in less than 4.0 seconds, making it faster than the first-generation ZZ.

On the GLM website, it was announced that the Tommykaira ZZ ceased production at the end of June 2021.

== Appearances in media ==
The first generation Tommykaira ZZ-R appears in The Devil's Star, a Nordic noir novel by Norwegian author Jo Nesbø, where it is the car used by detective Tom Waaler.

== See also ==
- Tommykaira ZZII, a planned counterpart to the ZZ
- ASL Garaiya, a planned successor to the ZZ
