= GLM Co. Ltd. =

Japanese company

- Trade name: GLM
- Native name: GLM株式会社
- Romanized name: GLM kabushiki gaisha
- Type: Kabushiki gaisha
- Industry: Automotive
- Founded: April 2010; 16 years ago
- Headquarters: Fushimi-ku, Kyoto, Kyoto, Japan
- Key people: Alexander Julian (President)
- Revenue: ¥1,563,570,000 (2020)
- Net income: ¥317,736,000 (2020)
- Total assets: ¥101,392,200 (2020)
- Website: glm.jp

GLM Co. Ltd. is a Japanese company headquartered in Fushimi-ku, Kyoto, Japan. Their main businesses include the development and sales of electric vehicles (EVs).

== History ==
The "Kyoto Electric Vehicle Project" was launched at Kyoto University VBL (Venture Business Laboratory) in 2006 and commercialized in April 2010 when it was branded Green Lord Motors Co., Ltd. was established. The company name was changed to GLM Co. Ltd. in April 2014. In 2018, a four-story technical center with a head office function was completed in Fushimi-ku, Kyoto.

GLM developed a finished vehicle business under their own brand and a platform business that provides technical cooperation and joint/contract development with other companies. So far, it has announced joint development with Asahi Kasei, Teijin, Toyo Tires, etc. In September 2016, Yaskawa Electric Corporation announced a capital tie-up with GLM. In July 2017, GLM formed a capital tie-up with Hong Kong's mainboard-listed Aulux HD; it changed its name to WE Solutions Limited in 2018.

== Tommykaira ZZ ==
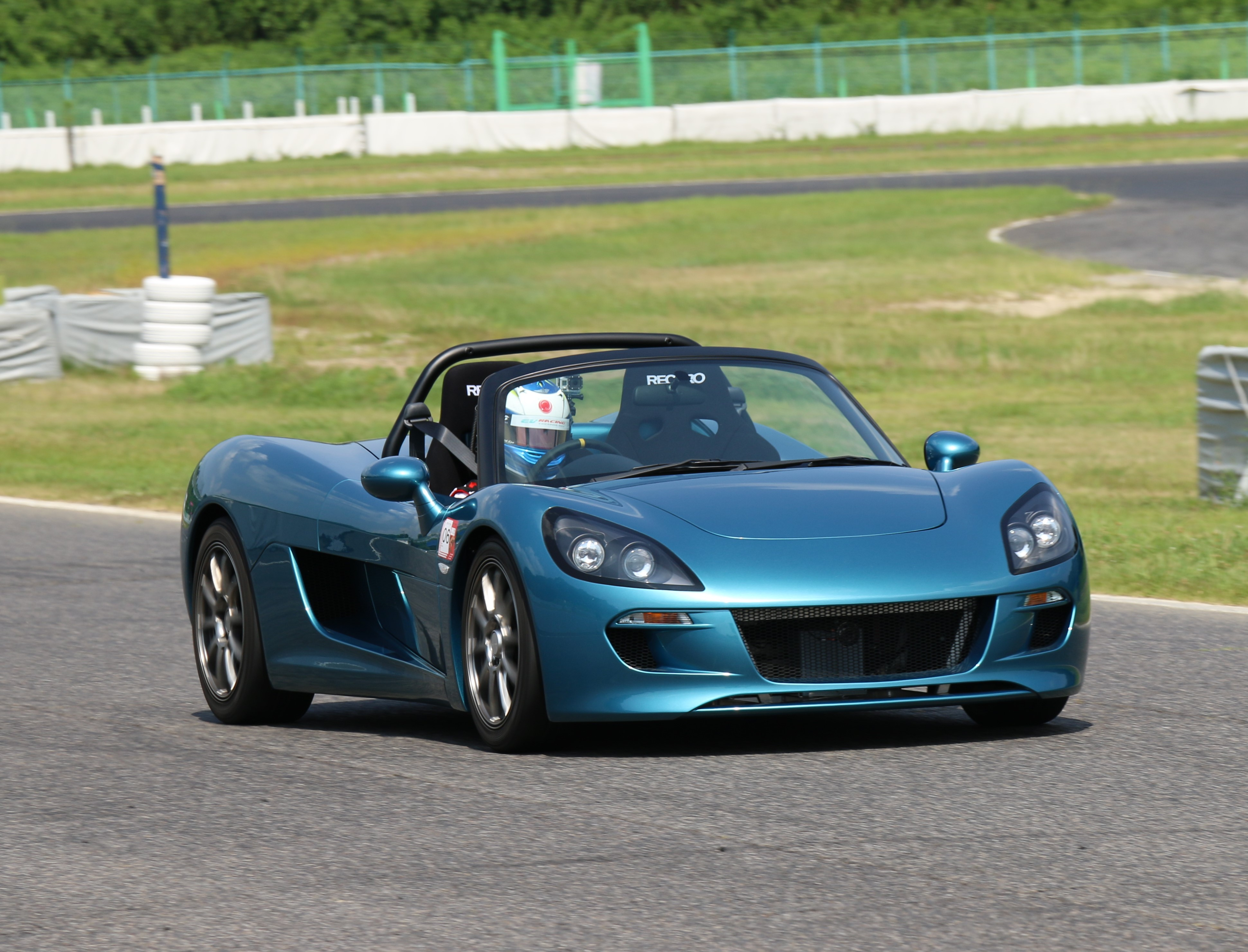
Tommykaira ZZ

GLM's first vehicle is the sports car type electric vehicle Tommykaira ZZ, the first mass-produced sports car model as a domestic EV. Full-scale mass production had started in October 2015 at a dedicated factory of Kosaka Metal Industry in Maizuru, Kyoto, which also handles amphibious vehicles of the Japan Self-Defense Forces. The selling price is 8 million yen excluding tax, and it is on sale only for 99 units.

By using high-rigidity aluminum for the chassis and fibre-reinforced plastic (FRP) for the exterior frame, it have succeeded in reducing the weight of the vehicle by less than 1 ton, even though it is an EV standard for ordinary passenger cars. Based on the concept of "a racing car that runs on public roads," it is designed with an emphasis on the enjoyment of maneuvering on its own, eliminating power steering, brake boosters, and traction control systems. Equipped with a high-power motor with a maximum output of 225 kW (306 PS; 302 hp), it accelerates from 0 to 100 km/h (62 mph) in 3.9 seconds. It is a two-seater open car type with a maximum speed of 180 km/h (110 mph). The cruising range on a single charge is 120 km (75 mi). A soft top can be equipped as an option.

The ZZ inherits the concept, car name, and logo mark of the "Tommykaira ZZ" (206 units sold worldwide from 1997 to 2001) produced by Tommykaira in Kyoto. It is produced by the same handmade as overseas luxury sports cars, and it is also possible to deliver the car according to the owner's wishes such as exterior color. Not only the internal structure such as the motor and battery, but also the appearance, body, parts and parts are all newly developed by GLM alone or in collaboration with partner companies.

Yuji Fujimune, general manager of the technical division who directed the body design of Lexus at Toyota, and engineers of the former Tommykaira Yume Factory, who was developing the ZZ gasoline car, are involved in the development. It took four years from the start of new car development in October 2011 to full-scale mass production at a dedicated factory.

In 2015, the ZZ was exhibited at the Goodwood Festival of Speed, a global motorsport event in the United Kingdom.

== Platform business ==
GLM is a business that provides automobile engineering services and know-how specialized for EVs developed by the company. It mainly provides R & D support and mass production support to domestic and overseas automobile manufacturers, and technical and development support for automobile-related businesses such as parts, materials, chemicals, and IT manufacturers.

== Vehicles ==
Tommykaira ZZ

In 2015, mass production of the first domestically produced sports car type electric vehicle "Tommykaira ZZ" started. See above for details.

GLM G4

At the 2016 Paris Motor Show, the concept car of the EV supercar "GLM G4" was announced.

The G4 will be an electric vehicle version of the Roadyacht GTS sold by Savage Rivale, a Dutch automaker with which GLM acquired a portion of its shares in 2016 and formed a capital and business alliance. At the Japan premiere in April 2017, it announced that it plans to sell 1,000 units at an estimated price of 40 million yen.

However, in March 2018, it announced that it would focus on the platform business and announced that it would concentrate on the development of the "second generation platform." As a result, the G4 has decided to review all plans such as sales area, selling price, specifications, etc., but the company says that it will announce it as a new vehicle equipped with this second generation platform.

== Management policy ==
The company is developing a business based on a horizontal division of labor model. Rather than one-sided work instructions to suppliers as in the conventional automobile industry, EV development concept, development status, necessary parts content, reason for parts shape and specifications, etc. are disclosed to some extent, based on two-way information disclosure. This is intended to allow cooperating companies to utilize their technology at an early stage and acquire new knowledge through information sharing.

GLM calls the cooperative relationship with automobile-related companies and institutions the "GLM ecosystem." The number of participating companies is steadily increasing, supporting the quality and speed of development of the company's EV. Currently, they have built relationships with more than 200 companies, including GS Yuasa, Nichicon, and the Bosch, and their strength is that they can develop vehicles using not only their own vehicle development resources but also relationships with suppliers.
