= Nissan RB engine =

Internal combustion engine

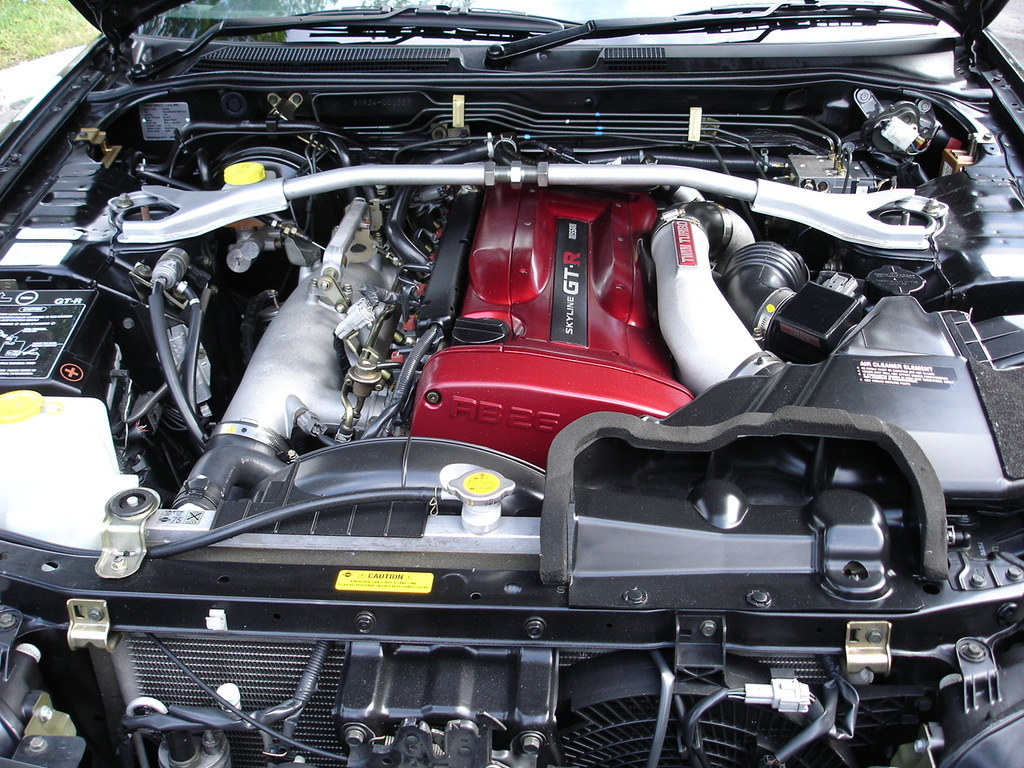
- RB26DETT in an R34 Skyline GT-R

Overview
- Manufacturer: Nissan (Nissan Machinery)
- Production: 1985–2004; 2019–present (new production; RB26)

Layout
- Configuration: Straight-six
- Displacement: 2.0 L (1,998 cc; 121.9 cu in); 2.4 L (2,428 cc; 148.2 cu in); 2.5 L (2,498 cc; 152.4 cu in); 2.6 L (2,568 cc; 156.7 cu in); 2.8 L (2,770 cc; 169.0 cu in); 3.0 L (2,962 cc; 180.8 cu in)
- Cylinder bore: 78 mm (3.07 in); 86 mm (3.39 in); 87 mm (3.43 in)
- Piston stroke: 69.7 mm (2.74 in); 71.7 mm (2.82 in); 73.7 mm (2.90 in); 77.7 mm (3.06 in); 85 mm (3.35 in)
- Cylinder block material: Cast iron
- Cylinder head material: Aluminium
- Valvetrain: SOHC 2 valves x cyl. DOHC 4 valves x cyl. with NVCS
- Compression ratio: 7.8:1-10:1

Combustion
- Turbocharger: Single Garrett T3; Twin Garrett T28-type ceramic with intercooler (RB26DETT)
- Fuel system: Carburetor; Electronic Fuel injection
- Management: Hitachi, NICS, ECCS
- Fuel type: Gasoline; Autogas; LPG
- Cooling system: Water-cooled

Output
- Power output: 94–280 PS (93–276 hp; 69–206 kW)
- Torque output: 142–392 N⋅m (105–289 lb⋅ft)

Chronology
- Predecessor: Nissan L engine
- Successor: Nissan VQ engine Nissan VR engine

The RB engine is an oversquare 2.0–3.0 L straight-6 four-stroke gasoline engine from Nissan produced from 1985 to 2004. The RB followed the 1983 VG-series V6 engines to offer a full, modern range in both straight or V layouts. It was part of a new engine family name PLASMA (Powerful & Economic, Lightweight, Accurate, Silent, Mighty, Advanced).

The RB engine family includes single overhead camshaft (SOHC) and double overhead camshaft (DOHC) engines. Both SOHC and DOHC versions have an aluminium head. The SOHC versions have 2 valves per cylinder and the DOHC versions have 4 valves per cylinder; each cam lobe moves only one valve. All RB engines have belt driven cams and a cast iron block. Most turbo models have an intercooled turbo (the exceptions being the single cam RB20ET & RB30ET engines), and most have a recirculating factory blow off valve (the exceptions being when fitted to Laurels and Cefiros) to reduce compressor surge when the throttle quickly closes.

The RB engines are derived from the six-cylinder L20A engine, which has the same bore and stroke as the RB20. All RB engines were made in Yokohama, Japan where the VR38DETT engine was also made. Some RB engines were rebuilt by Nissan's Nismo division at the Omori Factory in Tokyo as well. All Z-Tune Skylines were rebuilt at the Omori Factory.

Since 2019, small-scale production of the RB26 blocks and heads are currently being produced as part of Nismo's Heritage Series.

== Bore and stroke ==
All Nissan engines follow a naming convention, identifying the engine family (in this case, RB), displacement, features present—see the list of Nissan engines for details.

The stock dimensions for the Nissan RB Engine:

- RB20 - 2.0 L (1,998 cc), bore x stroke: 78 mm × 69.7 mm (3.07 in × 2.74 in)
- RB24 - 2.4 L (2,428 cc), bore x stroke: 86 mm × 69.7 mm (3.39 in × 2.74 in)
- RB25 - 2.5 L (2,498 cc), bore x stroke: 86 mm × 71.7 mm (3.39 in × 2.82 in)
- RB26 - 2.6 L (2,568 cc), bore x stroke: 86 mm × 73.7 mm (3.39 in × 2.90 in)
- RB30 - 3.0 L (2,962 cc), bore x stroke: 86 mm × 85 mm (3.39 in × 3.35 in)
- "D" indicates a dual overhead cam as opposed to a single overhead cam
- "E" indicates the individual engine ports are electronically fuel-injected 'single-cam'
- "S" indicates the engine is carbureted
- "T" indicates the engine has a factory installed turbocharger
- "TT" indicates the engine has factory installed twin turbochargers
- "P" indicates the engine runs on LPG (liquefied petroleum gas)

== RB20 (2.0L I6) ==
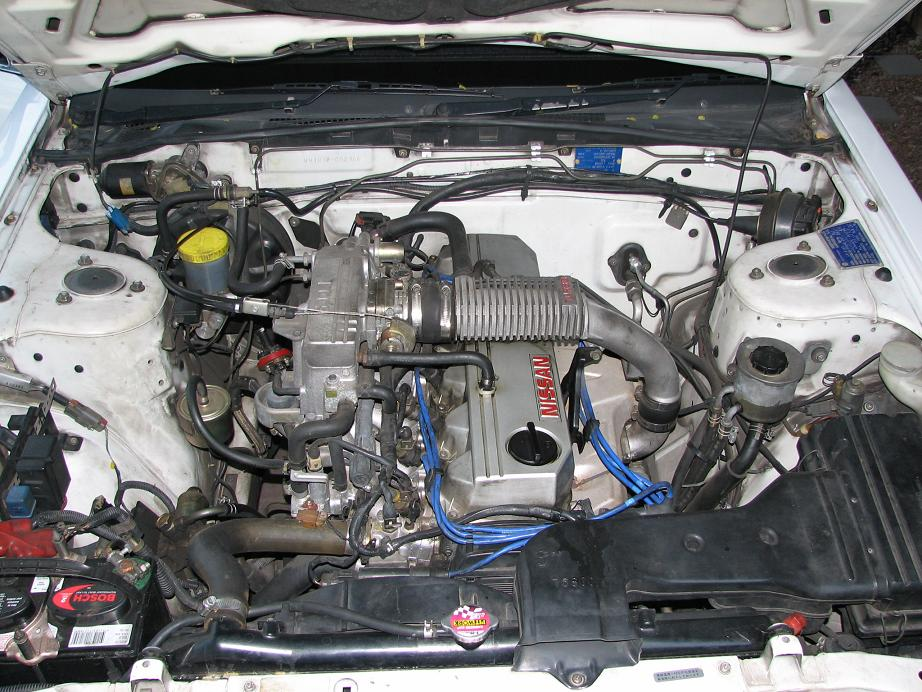
RB20ET engine in an R31 Passage Wagon

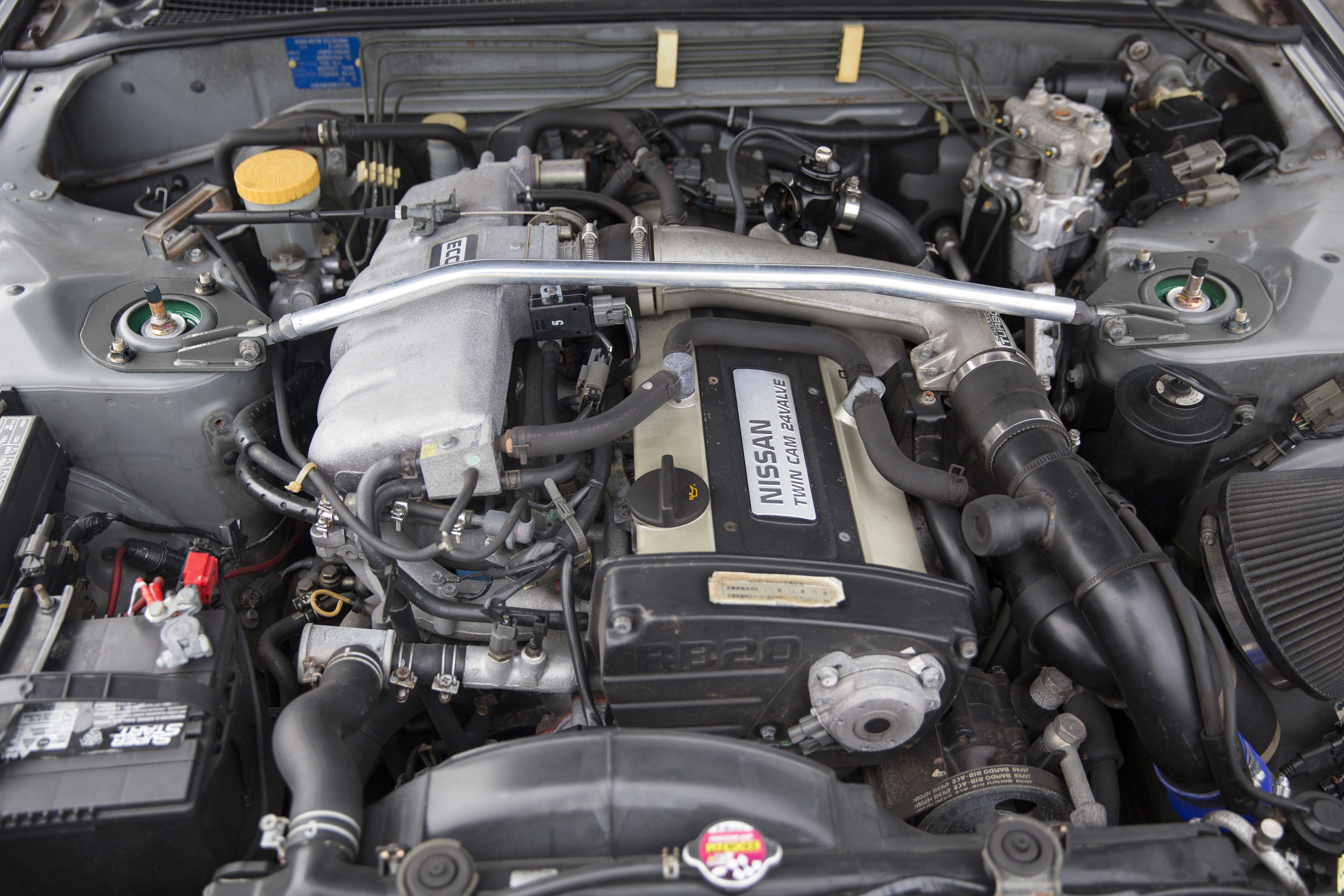
RB20DET engine in Skyline GTS-4 (HNR32)

The first RB20ET/DE/DET engines were fitted to the HR31 Skyline and the Nissan Fairlady 200ZR (Z31 chassis), produced from August 1985. The early twin cam engines featured the NICS (Nissan Induction Control System) injection system, while the later twin cam engines used ECCS (Electronic Concentrated Control System). Later versions which used ECCS engine management, discarded the twelve tiny runners for six much larger ones (though they retained twelve ports on the head, so there was a splitter plate). It was also fitted to the A31 Cefiro, C32 and C33 Laurel. The Fairlady 200ZR was fitted with an intercooled NICS type RB20DET.

The first RB20E engine was used in the C32 Nissan Laurel, produced from October 1984.

Laurels, R32 Skyline and Cefiros used the second (1989–1993) series RB20E/DE/DET. This had an improved head design, and used the ECCS injection system. These later motors are known as "Silver Top" engines.

The RB20DET-R was used in the Nissan Skyline 2000GTS-R (HR31) and was limited to 800 units.

There were a variety of 2.0 L RB20 engines produced:

- RB20E
  single-cam
  Power: 95 to 110 kW (127 to 148 hp; 129 to 150 PS) at 5600 rpm
  Torque: 167 to 181 N⋅m (123 to 133 lb⋅ft; 17.0 to 18.5 kg⋅m) at 4000–4400 rpm
  Camshaft duration: 232° intake; 240° exhaust
  Camshaft lift: 7.3 mm intake, 7.8 mm exhaust
- RB20ET
  single-cam, turbocharged
  Power: 125 kW (168 hp; 170 PS) at 6000 rpm
  Torque: 206 N⋅m (152 lb⋅ft; 21.0 kg⋅m) at 3200 rpm
- RB20DE
  twin-cam
  Power: 110 to 114 kW (148 to 153 hp; 150 to 155 PS) at 6400 rpm
  Torque: 181 to 186 N⋅m (133 to 137 lb⋅ft; 18.5 to 19.0 kg⋅m) at 5600 rpm
  Camshaft duration: 232° intake, 240° exhaust
  Camshaft lift: 7.3 mm (0.29 in) intake, 7.8 mm (0.31 in) exhaust
- RB20DET
  twin-cam, turbocharged
  Power: 158 kW (212 hp; 215 PS) at 6400 rpm
  Torque: 264 N⋅m (195 lb⋅ft; 26.9 kg⋅m) at 3200 rpm
  Camshaft duration: 240° intake, 240° exhaust; 248° intake, 240° exhaust ("Red Top")
  Camshaft lift: 7.3 mm (0.29 in) intake, 7.8 mm (0.31 in) exhaust; 7.8 mm (0.31 in) intake, 7.8 mm (0.31 in) exhaust ("Red Top")
- RB20P
  single-cam, 12 valves, autogas LPG
  Power: 94 PS (69 kW; 93 hp) at 5600 rpm
  Torque: 142 N⋅m (105 lb⋅ft; 14.5 kg⋅m) at 2400 rpm
- RB20DET-R
  twin-cam, turbocharged
  Power: 210 PS (154 kW; 207 hp) at 6400 rpm
  Torque: 245 N⋅m (181 lb⋅ft; 25.0 kg⋅m) at 4800 rpm
- RB20DE NEO
  twin-cam
  Power: 155 PS (114 kW; 153 hp)
  Torque: 186 N⋅m (137 lb⋅ft; 19.0 kg⋅m)

== RB24S (2.4L I6) ==
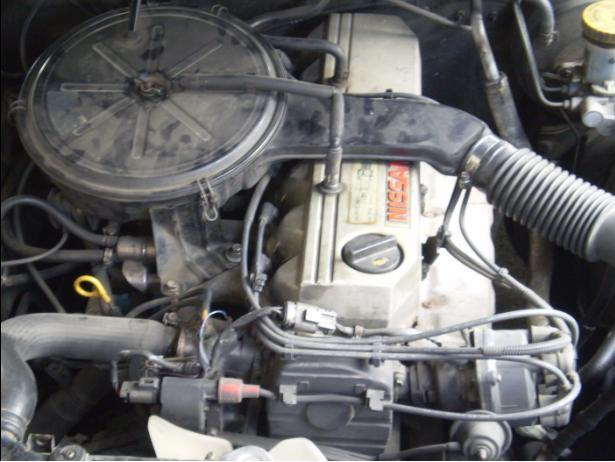
Nissan RB24S engine, Carburetor, SOHC, used in the Latin American market Laurel Altima A31 (an export market name for the A31 Cefiro)

This is a comparatively rare engine, as it was not produced for the Japanese domestic market. These were fitted to some left hand drive Nissan Cefiros exported from Japan new. Mechanically, the RB24S combines an RB30E head, RB25DE/DET block and RB20DE/DET crank with 34 mm height pistons. The resulting 86 mm × 69.7 mm (3.39 in × 2.74 in) bore and stroke combined to form a 2.4 L (2,428 cc) inline-six engine.

This engine used carburetors instead of the Nissan ECCS fuel injection system. It is able to rev higher than the RB25DE/DET (as it has the same stroke as the RB20DE/DET) as well as being almost the same displacement as the RB25DE/DET. A common modification is to fit a twin cam head from other RB series motors while retaining the carburetor set-up. The standard single cam form produced 141 PS (139 hp; 104 kW) at 5,000 rpm and 20.1 kg⋅m (145 lb⋅ft; 197 N⋅m) of torque at 3,000 rpm.

== RB25 (2.5L I6) ==
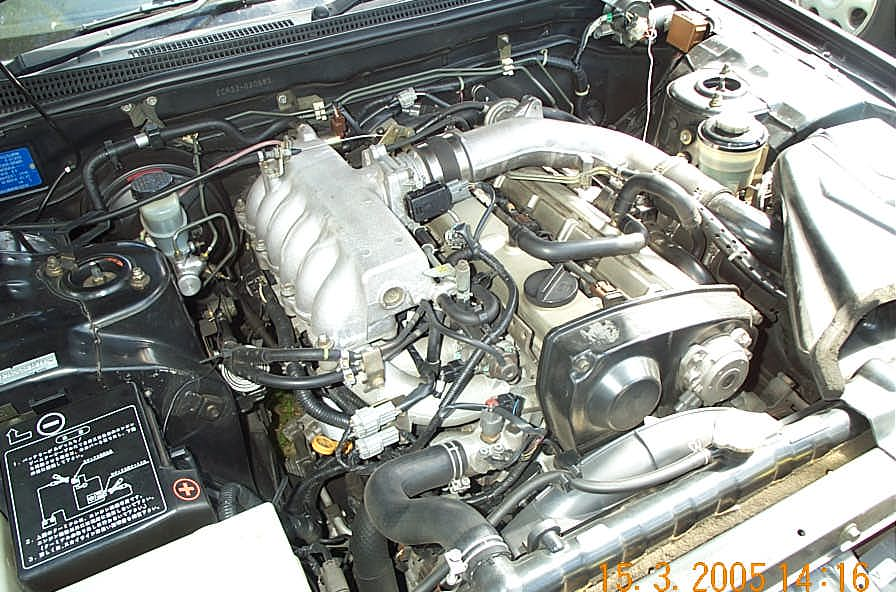
1993 RB25DET with VCT (NVCS)

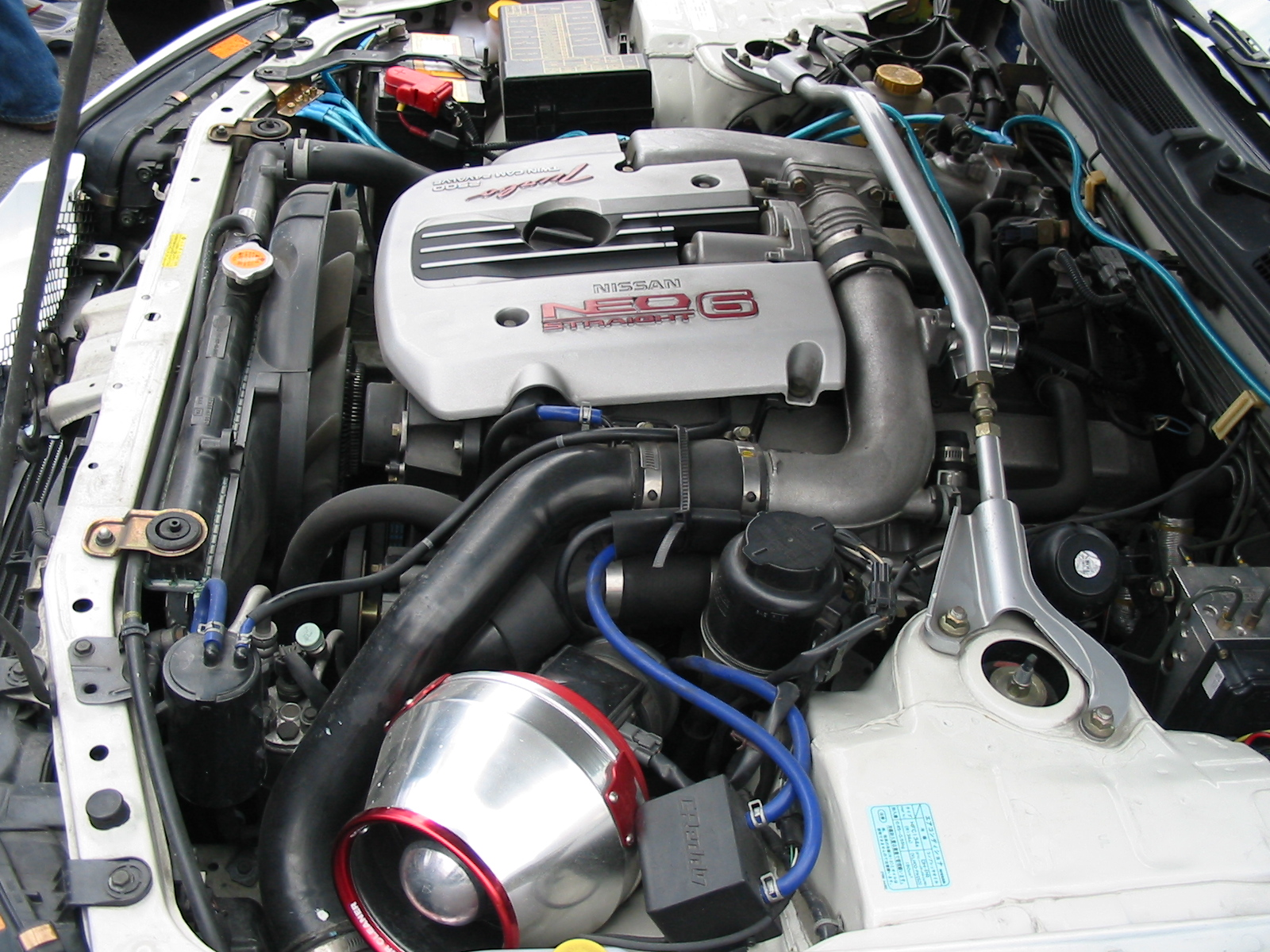
1998 NEO RB25DET

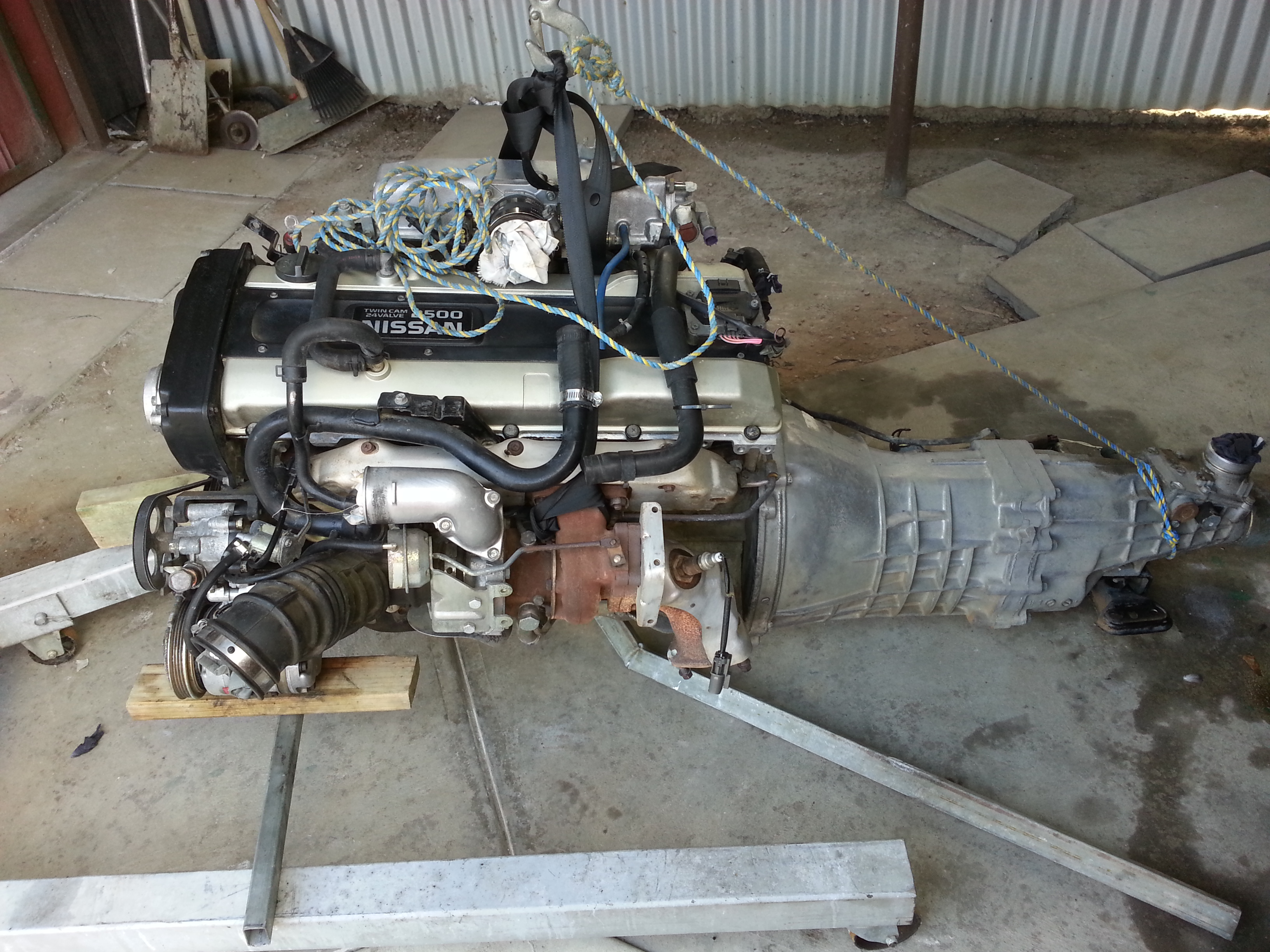
RB25DET and Transmission pulled from an R33 Skyline GTST

The RB25 series of engines was first introduced in the R32 Nissan Skyline GTS25 sedan and coupe models in 1991. The RB25DE (naturally aspirated) and DET (turbocharged) variants produced from August 1993 also featured NVCS (Nissan Variable Cam System) for the intake cam. This gave the new RB25DE more power and torque at lower rpm than the previous model. From 1995 (series 2 engines), both the RB25DE and RB25DET had a revised electrical system and the turbocharger on the RB25DET(S2) had a ceramic turbine wheel rather than aluminium. The most obvious change to the system was the introduction of ignition coils with built in ignitors, therefore the coil ignitor that was on previous models was not used. Other changes were a different air flow meter, ECU, cam angle sensor and throttle position sensor. Mechanically the series 1 and 2 are very similar, the only mechanical difference would be the camshafts as the series 2 cam angle sensor's shaft that goes into the exhaust cam is slightly different. Early series 2 featured the traditional Mitsubishi CAS which was later swapped for the Black Hitachi CAS which used a grooved shaft because of a half circle positioning tooth which occasionally broke off when removing CAS.

In May 1998 a NEO head was fitted, which enabled the engine to be classified as a low emission vehicle (LEV) engine due to their lower fuel consumption and emission output. The NEO head featured solid lifters (needing adjustment over time) rather than hydraulic (self adjusting), revised camshafts (higher lift lower duration to complement smaller ports and torque), with on/off solenoid variable VCT, used a hotter 82 °C (180 °F) thermostat, model-specific coil packs and a revised inlet manifold (the runner diameter is reduced from 50 to 45 mm (2.0 to 1.8 in) to increase air velocity and low end torque) in particular the RB25DE NEO which had two inlets going into the inlet manifold. The combustion chamber of the head is smaller so model-specific pistons are used to compensate. The turbo received the larger OP6 turbine wheel, while some came with an aluminium compressor and super alloy turbine wheels, others had the nylon plastic compressor wheel and ceramic turbine wheel. Turbo engines were upgraded to use GT-R spec connecting rods. Some also used an N1 type oil pump and had the oil pump drive collar on the crank revised to help cope with the breakage problems associated with fast, high revs. All in all they are quite a different engine in their own right — a culmination of 20 years of Nissan RB engine building rolled into one.

The non-VCT, non-turbo RB25DE was fitted to the R32 Skyline, the VCT turbo and non-turbo was fitted to R33 Skylines and the WNC34 Stagea and the Laurel C34. R34 Skyline, C35 Laurel and later Stagea (WGNC34) models use the NEO RB.

The 2.5 L RB25 engine was produced in four different forms:

- RB25DE
  twin-cam, non-turbo with 10:1 compression ratio
  Power: 180–200 hp (134–149 kW; 182–203 PS) at 6000 rpm
  Torque: 255 N⋅m (188 lb⋅ft; 26.0 kg⋅m) at 4000 rpm
- RB25DET
  twin-cam, turbocharged (T3 Turbo) with 9:1 compression ratio
  Power: 245–250 hp (183–186 kW; 248–253 PS)
  Torque: 319 N⋅m (235 lb⋅ft; 32.5 kg⋅m)
- RB25DE NEO
  twin-cam, non-turbo with 10:1 compression ratio
  Power: 197 hp (147 kW; 200 PS) at 6000 rpm
  Torque: 255 N⋅m (188 lb⋅ft; 26.0 kg⋅m) at 4000 rpm
- RB25DET NEO
  twin-cam, turbocharged (T3 Turbo, "45V3" with OP-6 compressor) with 9:1 compression ratio
  Power: 276 hp (206 kW; 280 PS) at 6400 rpm
  Torque: 362 N⋅m (267 lb⋅ft; 36.9 kg⋅m) at 3200 rpm)

== RB26 (2.6L I6) ==
=== RB26DE ===
The RB26DE is a naturally aspirated variant of the RB26DETT made specifically for the 1992 Nissan Skyline Autech Version GTS-4 (HNR32) sedan. Mechanically, it is similar to the RB26DETT as it uses the same cylinder head, bore and stroke (86 mm × 73.7 mm (3.39 in × 2.90 in)) and individual intakes as the RB26DETT, minus the usage of a parallel twin-turbo system. The engine and ECU (engine control unit) were tuned by Autech and S&S Engineering to make 220 PS (162 kW; 217 hp) at 6,800rpm and 245 N⋅m (181 lb⋅ft; 25.0 kg⋅m) at 5,200rpm. It also has a higher compression ratio than the RB26DETT, at 10.5:1.

=== RB26DETT ===
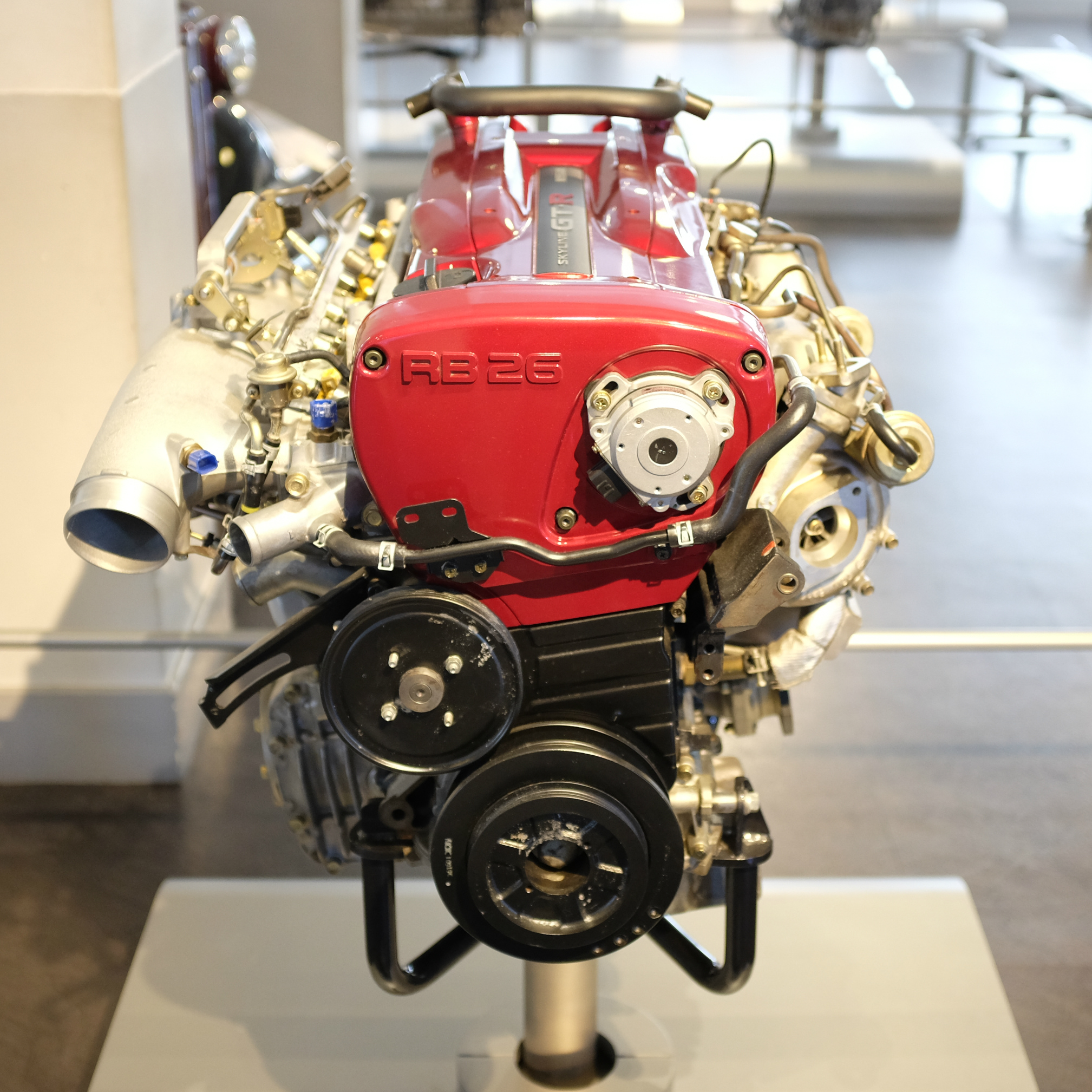
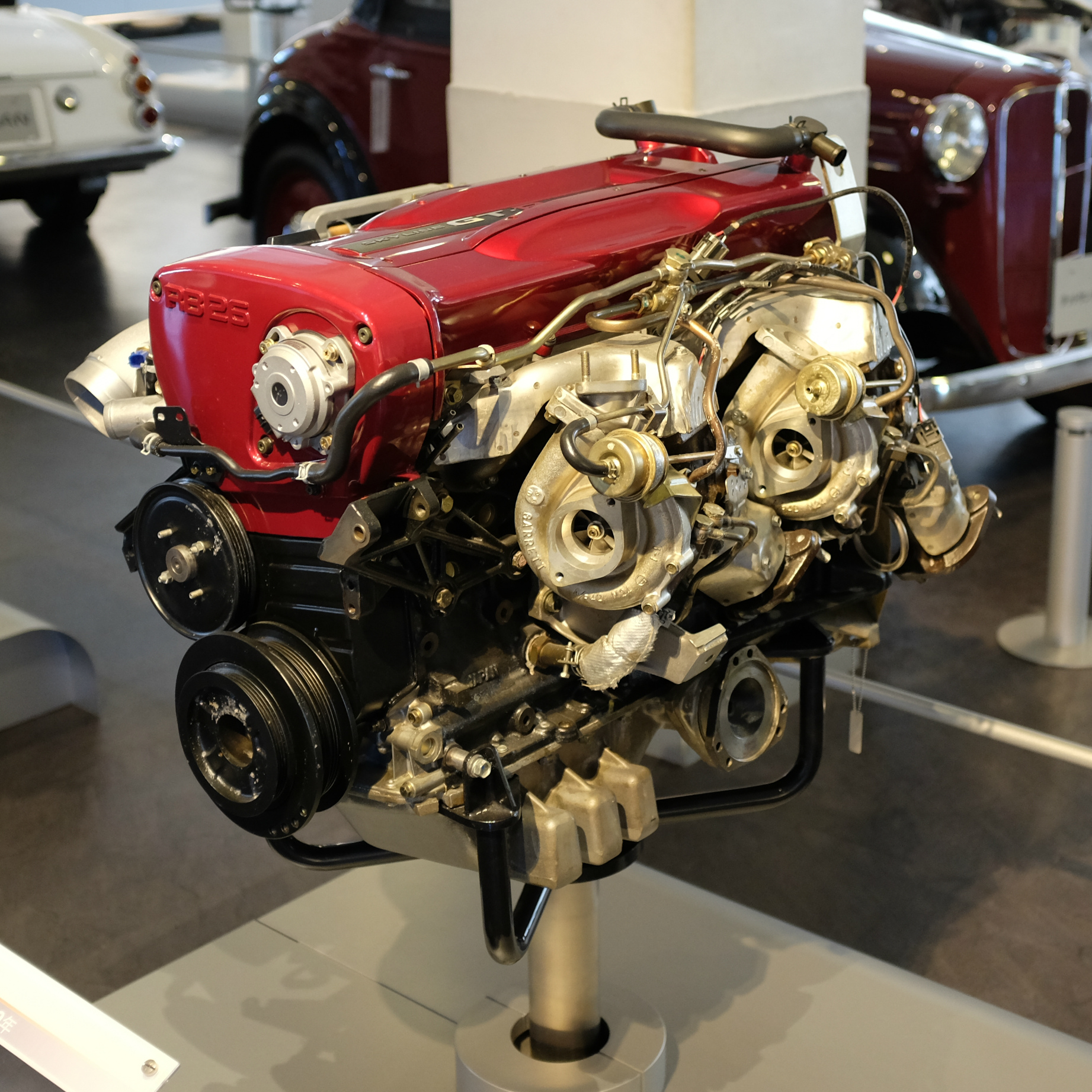
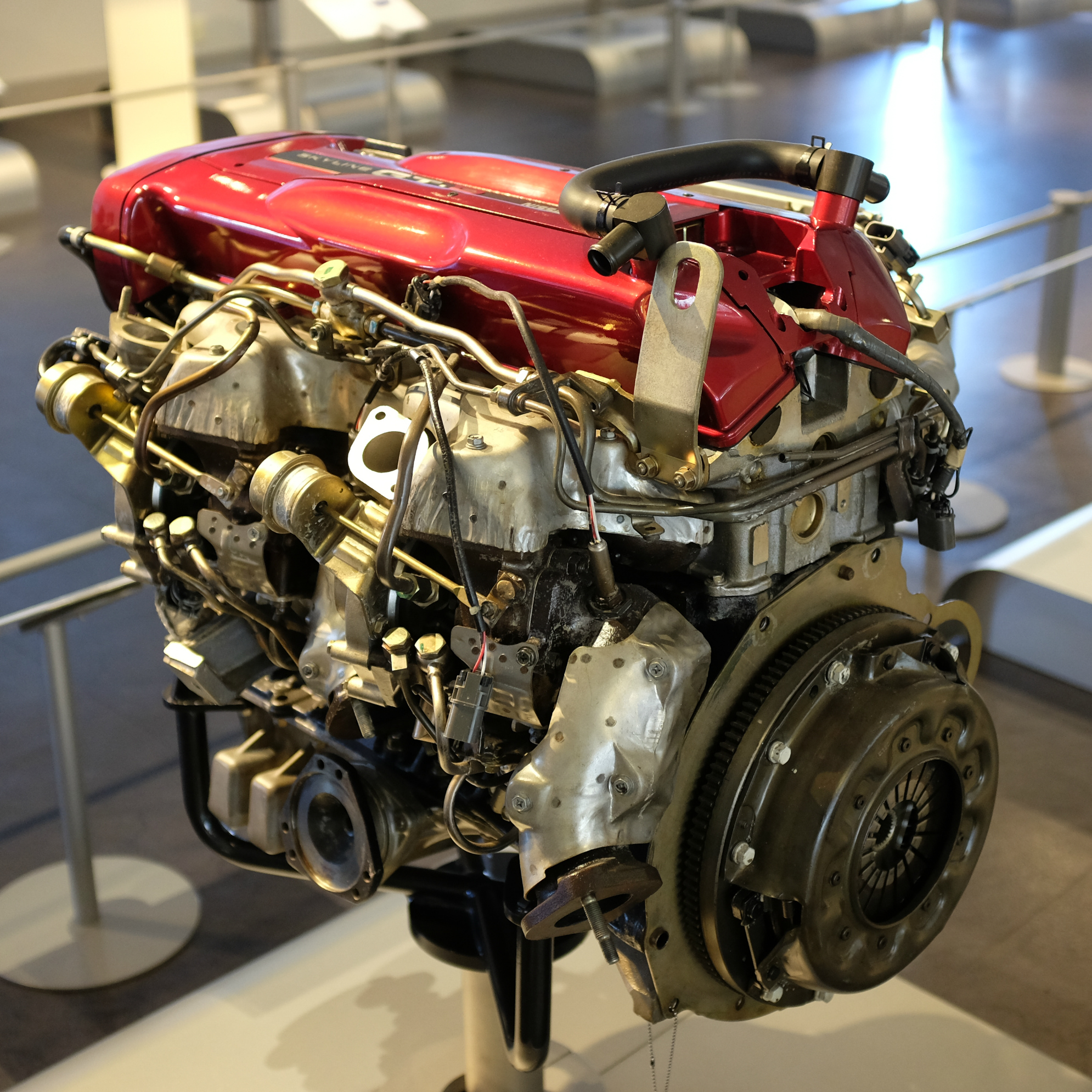
This Nissan RB26DETT engine is on display at the Nissan Engine Museum in Yokohama, Japan.

The RB26DETT engine is a 2.6 L (2,568 cc) twin-turbo inline-six engine manufactured by Nissan, for use in the 1989-2002 Nissan Skyline GT-R. The RB26DETT engine block is made from cast iron, while the cylinder head is made from aluminium alloy, which contains DOHC 4 valves per cylinder (24 valves in total) setup. The intake of the RB26DETT varies from other RB-series motors in that it has six individual (3 sets of 2 throttle assemblies that are siamesed together) instead of a single throttle body. The engine also uses a parallel twin-turbo system, using a pair of T25-type ceramic turbochargers set by the wastegates to limit boost pressure to 10 psi (0.69 bar), although the Skyline GT-R has a built in boost restrictor to keep boost under 14 psi (0.97 bar).

The first 2.6 L RB26DETT was rated by Nissan at around 276 bhp (280 PS; 206 kW) at 6,800 rpm and 353 N⋅m; 260 lbf⋅ft (36 kg⋅m) at 4,400 rpm. By the end of production, power levels had gone up to around 320 PS (235 kW; 316 hp) at 6,800 rpm and 392 N⋅m; 289 lbf⋅ft (40 kg⋅m) at 4,400 rpm, not only because of developments and modifications to the engine, but also because of the "Gentlemen's Agreement" made between automakers at the time to limit the "advertised" horsepower of any vehicle to 280 PS (276 bhp; 206 kW). While the published figures from Nissan were as quoted above, it has been known among enthusiasts that the car actually had a factory power output closer to the 320 PS (235 kW; 316 hp) figure. The RB26 is widely known and became quite popular for its strength and power potential thanks to its iron block and forged internals, making it a modification friendly platform for tuners and aftermarket modifications in general.

	Duration		Lift	
Camshaft	Intake	Exhaust	Intake	Exhaust
RB26DETT (05U)	240°	236°	8.58 mm (0.338 in)	8.28 mm (0.326 in)
RB26DETT N1 (24U)	240°	236°	8.58 mm (0.338 in)	8.28 mm (0.326 in)

Some factory features of the RB26DETT:

- 6 throttle body intake
- Solid lifter valve actuation, shim under bucket
- Belt driven cams
- CAS (crank angle sensor) driven off exhaust cam, tells ECU (engine control unit) crank/cam position
- water cooled, oil pressure lubed turbos
- OEM cast pistons have cooling channels under the crowns (extra oil cooling to keep piston temperatures down)
- Piston oil squirters
- Sodium filled exhaust valves
- 8 Counter weighted crankshaft
- 'I' beam connecting rods

There is a common oiling problem with the pre-1992 R32 RB26 motors, as the surface where the crankshaft meets the oil pump was machined too small, eventually leading to oil pump failure at high rpm. This issue was resolved in later versions of the RB26 with a wider oil pump drive, which is found in all Series 3 R32 and onward RB26 motors. Aftermarket performance parts makers also make oil pump extension drive collars to rectify this problem. More recently a spline drive solution has been developed by an aftermarket tuner Supertec Racing who moves away from the OEM flat drive system and uses splines to drive the oil pump gears in the same way as the Toyota's 1JZ-GTE engine found in the Toyota Supra (MK3). This kit is available for most uprated RB26 oil pumps including Nissan's own OEM, N1 and Nismo parts, although most high HP RB-series engines all over the world have been proven to be reliable without spline driven oil pumps when built and tuned correctly.

Besides minor cosmetic updates and ECU fine tunings, changes were made in the R34 generation to ball bearing T28 turbochargers as opposed to journal bearing turbos. The R34 GT-R turbos retained the ceramic exhaust turbine wheel. Models that had steel exhaust turbine wheels included the R32 Nismo, R32-R33-R34 N1 models and R34 Nür spec skyline GT-R's.

R34 GT-R model RB26DETT engine specific differences to the R32-R33 engines include:

- Candy red cam/coil pack covers
- Different coil cover emblem
- Plastic CAM gear cover
- Non-painted inlet plenum (apparently also a lighter casting)
- Hitachi CAS (Crank angle sensor) has different drive fitting compared to earlier R32-R33 exhaust cams
- Igniter built into coil packs (no igniter pack on the rear of coil cover)
- Ball bearing turbochargers with ceramic exhaust turbine wheels
- Stainless steel dump pipes
- Sump front differential has a different ratio (3:55)
- Different diameter coolant/heater pipes on intake side of block
- Dual mass flywheel

Originally, the R32 GT-R was planned to have the 2.4 L RB24DETT and compete in the 4000 cc class (in Group A rules, the displacement is multiplied by 1.7 if the engine is turbocharged). This was at a time when Nismo was going through the process of designing the R32 GT-R to be a Group A race car. However, when the engineers added the AWD system, they found that it made the car heavier than expected and as a result, much less competitive. Nismo made the decision to make the engine a 2.6 L twin-turbo and compete in the higher 4500 cc class, resulting in the RB26DETT engine many known today.

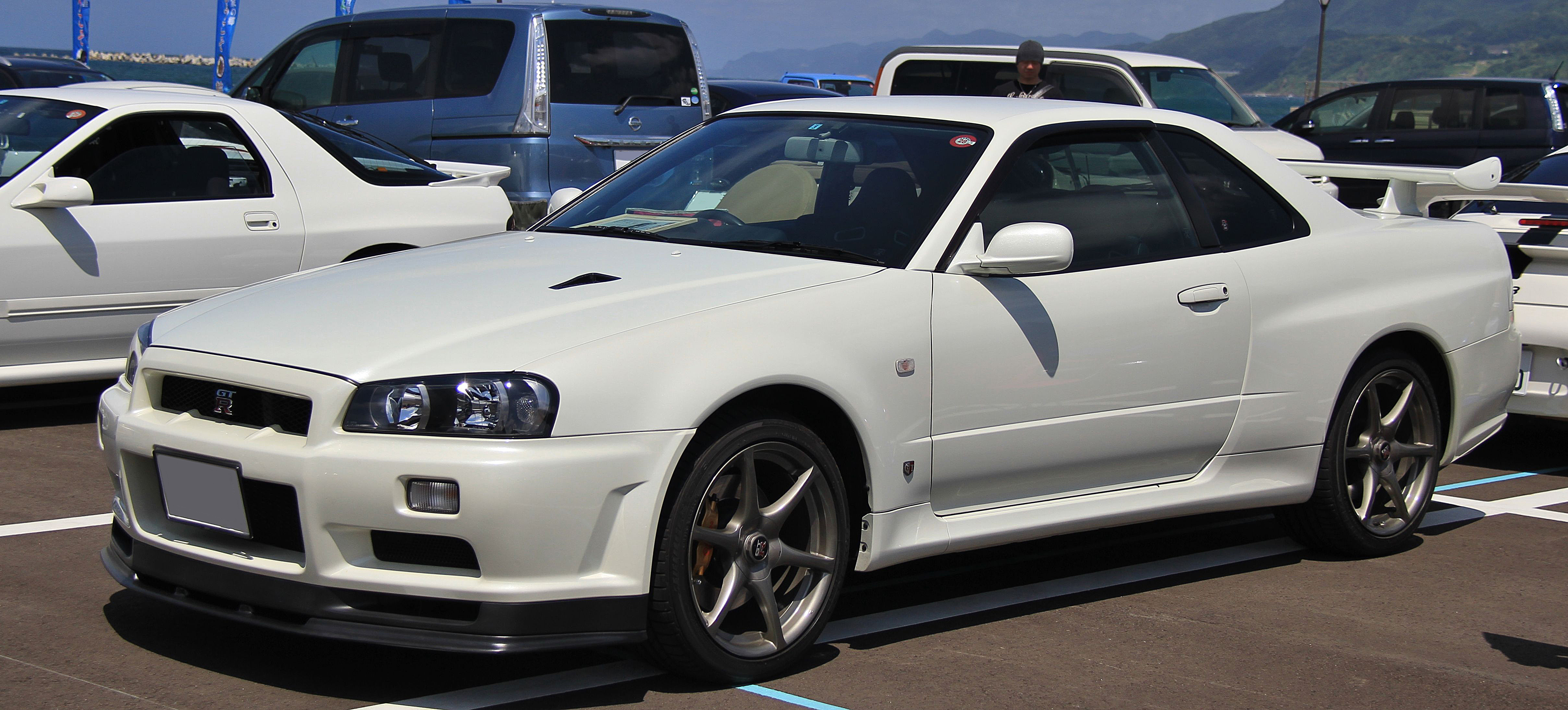
The Nissan Skyline GT-R V-spec II (BNR34) is powered by the RB26DETT.

The RB26DETT was used in the following vehicles:

- Nissan Skyline GT-R BNR32
- Nissan Skyline GT-R BCNR33
- Nissan Skyline GT-R Autech Version 40th Anniversary BCNR33 (Autech factory-installed RB26DETT and AWD 5spd transmission in R33 sedan chassis)
- Nissan Skyline GT-R BNR34
- Nissan Stagea 260RS WGNC34改 (RS4 chassis used)
- Tommykaira ZZII (concept car)

=== RB26DETT N1 ===
The RB26DETT N1 is a modified version of the RB26DETT engine, developed by Nismo (Nissan Motorsports) for Group A and Group N motorsport. Nismo found that the standard RB26DETT engine required too much maintenance for use in a Group-A or Group-N race car and subsequently designed the N1 block; this was first used in Bathurst, Australia. Nismo balanced the crankshaft to a higher specification than stock, as the standard RB26DETT engine experiences vibrations between 7,000 and 8,000 rpm. The engine also received improved water and oil channels within the engine block. The pistons and top piston rings were also upgraded to 1.2 mm (0.047 in). The N1 engine also has upgraded camshafts and upgraded turbochargers.

Although all versions of the RB26DETT N1 engine use Garrett T25 turbochargers, the specification of the turbochargers changed through the 3 generations of the RB26DETT N1 engine (R32, R33, and R34). The R32, and R33 versions used Journal Bearing T25 Turbochargers. The R34 RB26DETT N1 engine used Garrett GT25 turbo chargers (which use a set of ball bearings).

The biggest difference between the turbochargers used in the N1 engine, and the standard RB26DETT engine, is that the turbine wheels in the turbocharger are made from steel, rather than the ceramic used for the standard RB26DETT turbochargers. The ceramic turbine wheels are found to be very unreliable when used at high rotational speeds inducing higher centrifugal forces (such as when the turbochargers are used at a higher boost pressure than stock). With the advances in manufacturing technology such as sealing and material processes.

The Nismo RB26DETT N1 engine block uses an 86 mm (3.39 in) bore which can be bored up to either 87 or 88 mm (3.43 or 3.46 in). The N1 block is cast with an identification mark of 24U, whereas the standard RB26DETT block is marked with 05U. The RB26DETT N1 block is compatible with all GT-R engine bays.

=== RB26DETT Z1 and Z2 ===
The RB26DETT Z1 and Z2 (and often referred to as an "RB28DETT Z1/Z2") was the engine used in the Nissan Skyline GT-R Z-Tune built by Nismo. It uses a stronger RB26 block based on Nissan's Le Mans GT2 and GT500 racing vehicles (stamped with RRR), stroked crankshaft, upgraded turbochargers, and a higher bore and stroke at a displacement of 2.8 L. It produces 500 PS (368 kW; 493 hp) and 540 N⋅m (400 lb⋅ft; 55 kg⋅m) of torque. The 'Z2' revision includes upgraded turbochargers supplied by IHI, and additional improvements to allow it to reach maximum RPM speeds of up to 8,000 rpm.

== RB30 (3.0L I6) ==
=== RB30E/ET ===
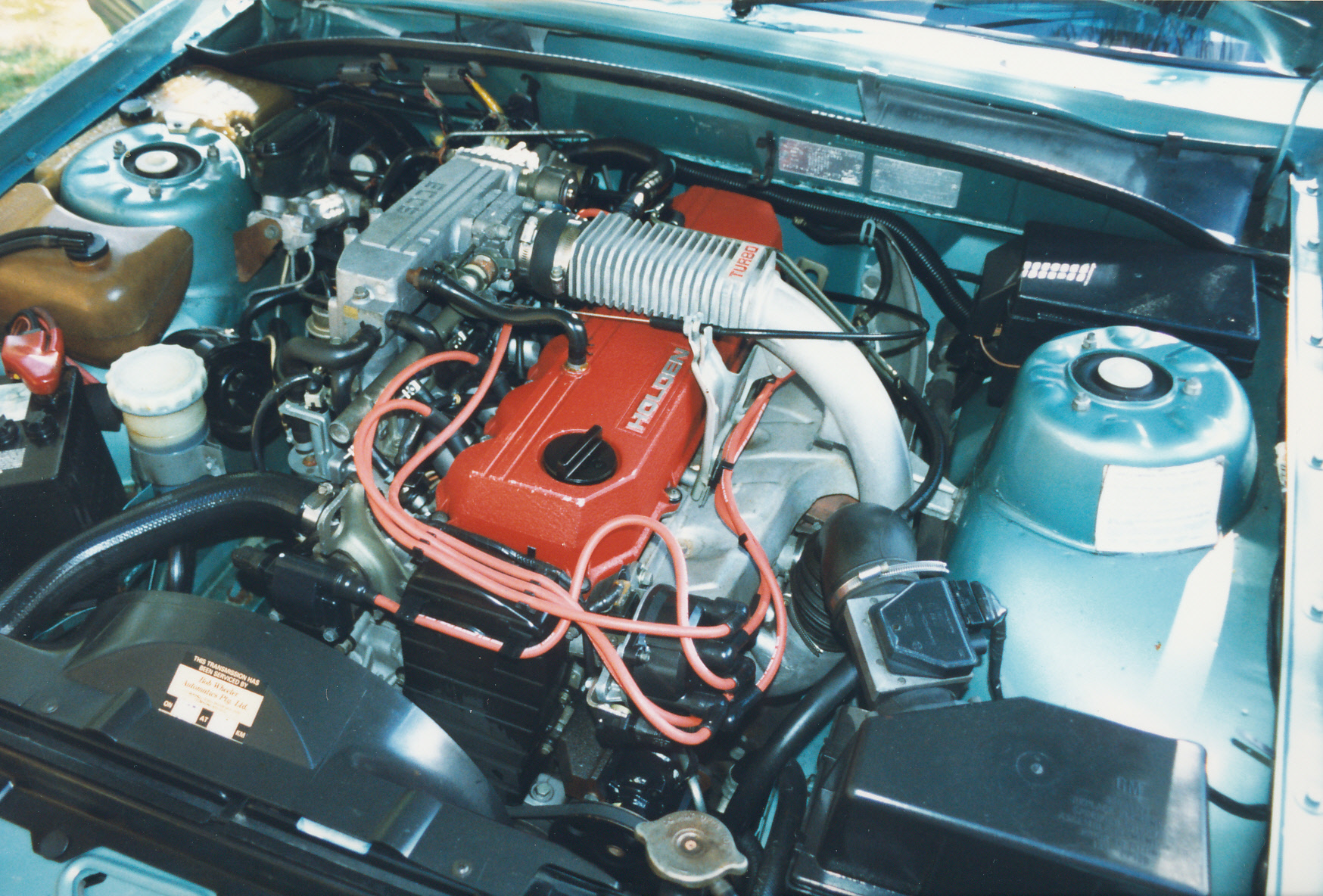
An RB30ET engine installed in an Australian-built Holden Commodore. Nissan supplied Holden with RB30E and RB30ET engines between 1986 and 1988.

RB30 were produced from 1985–1991:

- RB30S GQ Patrol - carburetted single-cam 100 kW (134 hp; 136 PS) at 4,800 rpm, 224 N⋅m (165 lb⋅ft; 22.8 kg⋅m) at 3000 rpm
- Powertech 6Ei (RB30E) VL Commodore - fuel-injected single-cam 114 kW (153 hp; 155 PS) at 5,200 rpm, 247 N⋅m (182 lb⋅ft; 25.2 kg⋅m) at 3,600 rpm)
- RB30E R31 Skyline - fuel-injected single-cam 114 kW (153 hp; 155 PS) at 5,200 rpm, 247 N⋅m (182 lb⋅ft; 25.2 kg⋅m) at 3,600 rpm) Initially quoted as 117 kW, 252 N⋅m but later revised
- RB30E R31 Skyline GTS1 - fuel-injected single-cam 130 kW (174 hp; 177 PS) at 5,500 rpm, 255 N⋅m (188 lb⋅ft; 26.0 kg⋅m) at 3,900 rpm)
- RB30E R31 Skyline GTS2 - fuel-injected single-cam 140 kW (188 hp; 190 PS) at 5,600 rpm, 270 N⋅m (200 lb⋅ft; 28 kg⋅m) at 4,400 rpm)
- Powertech 6EiT (RB30ET) VL Commodore - fuel-injected single-cam turbo 150 kW (201 hp; 204 PS) at 5,600 rpm, 296 N⋅m (218 lb⋅ft; 30.2 kg⋅m) at 3,200 rpm)

This motor was produced for use in the Skylines, Patrols and rights bought by Holden because the Holden 202 (3.3 L) powering the Holden Commodore could no longer satisfy tightening emissions requirements, and with all new cars required to run on unleaded petrol by 1986 a quick replacement was needed. Nissan Motor Co. sold the RB30E to Holden for the VL Commodore. Holden would give the engine the name 'Powertech 6Ei' and 'Powertech 6EiT' (for turbocharged applications), although these names would only appear in official videos and brochures, seldom being used outside of Holden content. The radiator being a cross flow design and is fitted lower in relation to the engine in the VL, there is an increased likelihood of air locks forming in the (alloy) cylinder head if the correct bleeding procedure isn't followed, causing this to overheat and warp. This was very unlikely in comparison to the R31 Skyline as the radiator is mounted higher. The engine proved to be very reliable apart from this issue. The RB30S was found in some Middle Eastern R31 Skylines and some GQ Nissan Patrols. The RB30E was found in R31 Skylines and VL Commodores in Australia as well as in South African R31 Skylines (with 126 kW (171 PS; 169 hp) at 5,000 rpm and 260 N⋅m (190 lb⋅ft; 27 kg⋅m) at 3,500 rpm)

The turbocharged RB30ET (producing 150 kW (204 PS; 201 hp)) was found only in the VL Commodore due to the conditions set out by Holden to Nissan in the contract to supply engines. It consists of a lower compression RB30E bottom end, more powerful oil pump, knock sensor, Garrett T3 turbocharger, 250 cc (15 cu in) injectors, different intake manifold and supporting ECU. The motor itself is still popular today in Australian and New Zealand motorsport and drag racing in VL Commodores, R31 Skylines and swaps in other vehicles.

Nissan Special Vehicles Division Australia produced two limited models of R31 Skylines, the GTS1 and GTS2. These contained slightly more powerful RB30E engines, containing longer opening duration cams and better flowing exhausts.

- GTS1 RB30E - injected single-cam 130 kW (177 PS; 174 hp) at 5,500 rpm, 255 N⋅m (188 lb⋅ft; 26.0 kg⋅m) at 3,500 rpm) - special cam profile, special exhaust
- GTS2 RB30E - injected single-cam 140 kW (190 PS; 188 hp) at 5,600 rpm, 270 N⋅m (200 lb⋅ft; 28 kg⋅m) at 4,400 rpm) - special cam profile, special exhaust, piggy back computer, valve porting

=== RB30DE ===
These rare engines were used in the Tommykaira M30 based on the R31 Skyline GTS and R32 Skyline GTSt. For the R31 M30, a modified RB20DE head was bolted onto the RB30E block. It delivered 177 kW (241 PS; 237 hp) at 7000 rpm and 294 N⋅m (217 lb⋅ft; 30.0 kg⋅m) at 4800 rpm.

For the R32 M30, the bore was enlarged to 87 mm and increased the displacement to 3030 cc. The head was also replaced with RB26DE head. This new version delivered 206 kW (280 PS; 276 hp) at 7200 rpm and 294 N⋅m (217 lb⋅ft; 30.0 kg⋅m) at 6100 rpm.

More commonly a hybrid conversion with an RB30E block and a twin cam RB25 head without a turbo is also used as a basis for the RB30DE.

=== RB30DET ===
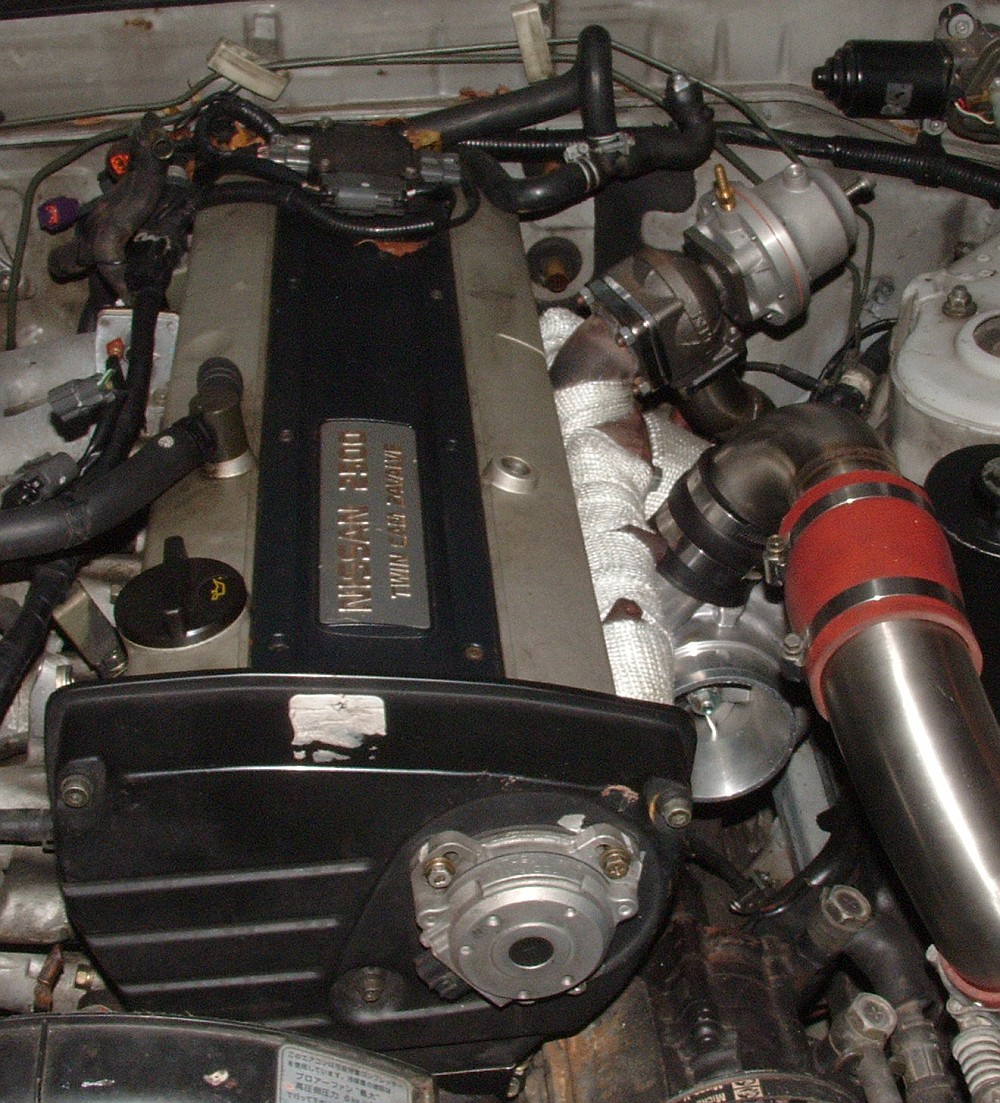
RB30DET - R31 RB30E block, R32 RB25DE head.

Nissan did not produce this engine. It refers to a turbocharged engine using an RB30E short block with the twin-cam head installed from another RB series engine. A common hybrid in Australia and New Zealand (referred to as the RB25/30 or RB26/30) uses an RB30E bottom end mated to a RB25DE, RB25DET or RB26DETT cylinder head and turbo (RB20DE and DET heads are not used as the bores are different in size (RB30 86 mm (3.39 in) RB20 78 mm (3.07 in)); but were originally modified and used on the Tommykaira RB30DE as the RB25 engine did not exist at the time). The RB25DE cylinder head from the A31 Cefiro C33 Laurel or R32 Skyline (aka: Non VCT) can be used. The RB25DET (from the R33 Skyline or C34 Laurel or Stagea) head is also used, however an external oil feed must be fabricated for the variable cam timing (VCT) on the RB25DET, and the oil galleries at the front of the engine are misaligned. The variable cam timing may be disconnected altogether. It may be necessary to reduce the size of the oil restrictors in the block and machine a full face oil pump drive collar onto the crank, (to prevent it shattering at high RPM), with the use of a twin cam oil pump.

The fitment of a twin cam head from any of these engines onto a standard compression RB30E bottom end gives a forced induction friendly compression ratio (around 8.2:1), for a mild to moderately modified street turbo engine, making the conversion popular amongst those who would otherwise convert their RB30E to a high compression RB30ET using original ET bolt on externals.

Although it has a larger displacement than the RB26DETT, maximum possible horsepower is less, as the RB30 block lacks the RB26 block's internal bracing, and consequently cannot rev as high due to harmonic issues at ~7500 rpm. To compensate, the RB30DET produces more torque at lower revs due to its longer stroke. However they have been known to reach engine speeds up to 11,000 rpm with extensive balancing and blueprinting.

There is also an 'RB30DETT' kit manufactured by OS Giken of Japan, which bolts an extension on top of the RB26 engine block, and fits liners, to give a bore and stroke of 86 mm × 86 mm (3.39 in × 3.39 in). It is available as an assembled short block, containing billet chrome-molybdenum crank, billet chrome-molybdenum H-beam connecting rods, forged pistons, and costs ¥1,500,000.

== RB-X GT2 and RB28DET (2.8L I6) ==
The RB-X GT2 (designed and built by REINIK) is an engine specially made for the NISMO 400R. The difference between this engine and a RB26DETT is that the engine is bored and stroked 87 mm × 77.7 mm (3.43 in × 3.06 in) which results in 2,770 cc (2.8 L). The engine produces 450 PS (444 hp; 331 kW) at 6800 rpm and 48 kg⋅m (471 N⋅m; 347 lbf⋅ft) at 4400 rpm.

This engine was manufactured with a reinforced cylinder block and cylinder head, metal head gasket, pistons with cooling channels, forged crank shaft, forged connecting rods, N1 turbine with reinforced actuator, high flow intake, stainless down pipe, and low exhaust resistant sport cats, most of which were not offered for the RB26DETT. RB-X GT2 engines competed in LeMans 24hr race, Pikes Peak, and other forms of motorsports. GT500 and Z-tune engines are also based on REINIK's design although later built by NISMO's Omori Factory.

REINIK also made over 20 RB28DET based on the R33 RB25DET. These engines were ordered by Prince Nissan Dealership network for a special edition R33 GT25t called 280 Type-MR. The engine was built for high torque and limited to 300 PS (296 hp; 221 kW) and 36 kg⋅m (353 N⋅m; 260 lbf⋅ft) of torque.

== Stroker kits ==
There are many stroker kits available for RB engines (some only available as proper kits while others being achievable by using cranks from other engines, for example a GT-R crank, pistons and rods in an RB25DET will make its displacement 2.6L as the bore is the same as an RB26DETT).

Achievable stroker displacements for RB engines:

- RB20 - 2.2, 2.4
- RB25 - 2.6, 2.7, 2.8
- RB26 - 2.7, 2.8, 2.9, 3.0, 3.15, 3.2, 3.3, 3.4 (Project RB)
- RB30 - 3.2 (Nitto), 3.3 (RIPS), 3.4 (Spool Imports)

== See also ==
- List of Nissan engines
