= London Motorexpo =

London Motorexpo was an annual motor show held from 1996 until 2015 in London.

It was launched in 1996 as a free outdoor alternative to the British International Motor Show and the London Motor Show. Held in Canary Wharf, it was designed to allow office workers a chance to see new cars without having to take time off to visit a traditional motor show.

The London Motorexpo normally took place in June, and often featured the first public viewing of new cars, though rarely concept cars as in a traditional motor show.

The final show took place in 2015.

== 2014 ==
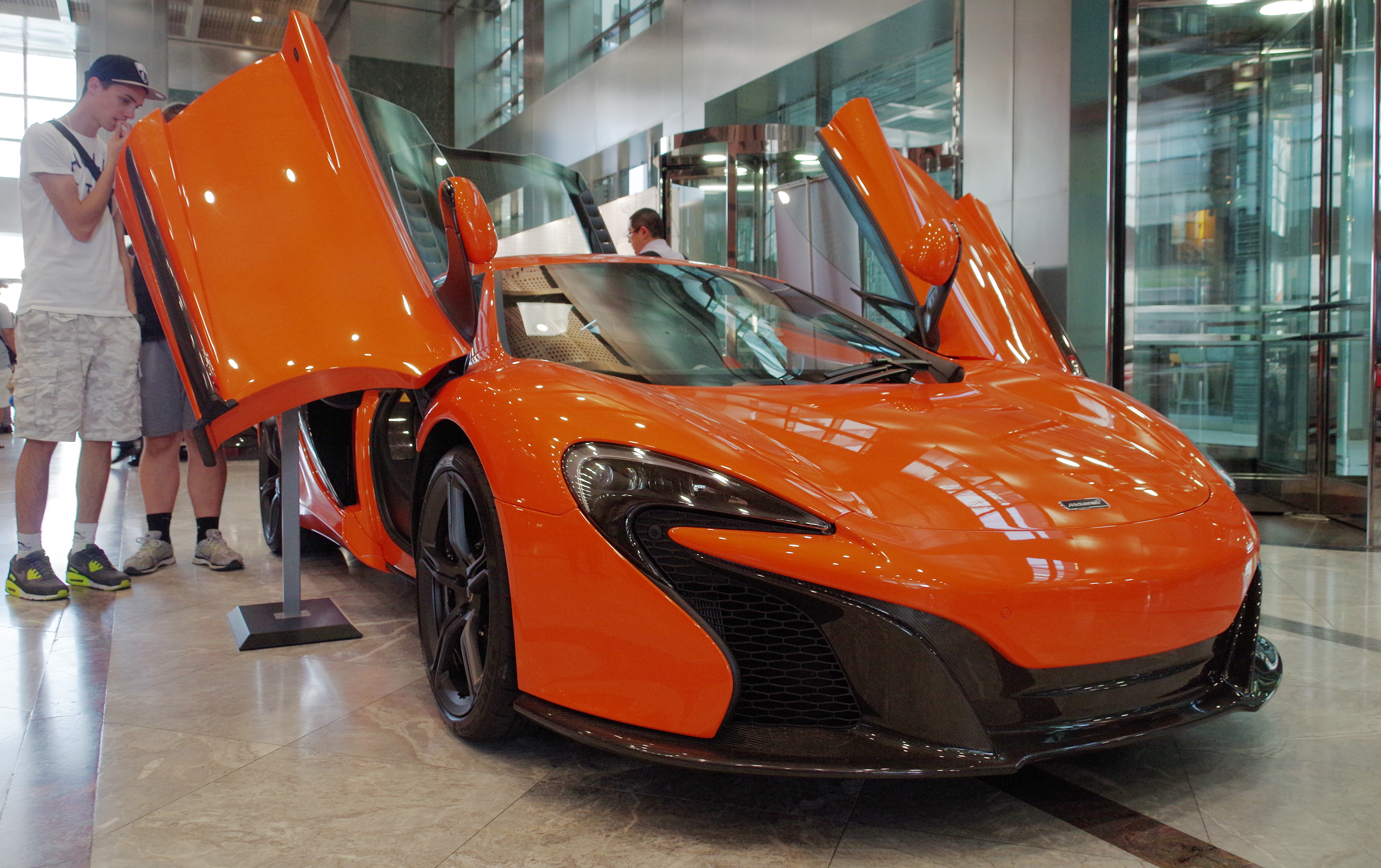
McLaren 650S at the 2014 London Motor Expo at Canary Wharf

The 2014 show included the UK launches of the Aston Martin Vanquish and Tesla Model S right-hand-drive.

== 2013 ==
The 2013 show included the UK introductions of the revised Skoda Superb, Jaguar XJR and Lightning GT.

== 2011 ==
The 2011 expo opened on 6 June and included a convoy of 50 Jaguar E-Types driven from Hyde Park to Canary Wharf to mark the car's 50th anniversary. The BMW 6 Series Coupe and Mercedes-Benz SLS AMG were some of the cars shown for the first time.

== 2010 ==
The 2010 show opened on 7 June and included the first viewing of the Mercedes-Benz E-Class Cabriolet and SLS AMG, Mini Countryman, Saab 9-5 and Volvo S60.

== 2009 ==
The 2009 expo included the UK launch of the Aston Martin DBS convertible and Aston Martin Vantage V12, Cadillac CTS-V, Jaguar XFR and XKR, Saab 9-3X and Tesla Roadster.

== 2008 ==
The 2008 show opened on 9 June and included the launch of the BMW X6 and the world premiere of the Breckland Beira V8, a British sports car based on the GM Kappa platform that never reached production.

== 2004 ==
The 2004 show was sponsored by The Daily Telegraph and featured 50 exhibitors.
