= Tommykaira ZZII =

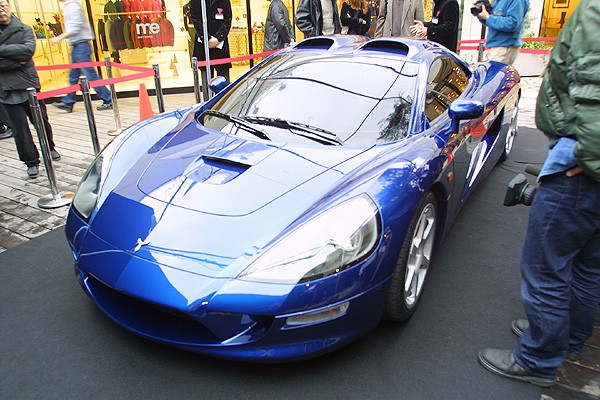

Overview
- Manufacturer: Tommykaira
- Also called: ASL RS01
- Production: 2001 (one prototype)
- Designer: Noriyuki Nishida

Body and chassis
- Class: Sports car (S)
- Body style: 2-door coupe
- Layout: Mid-engine, four-wheel-drive
- Platform: Tommykaira ZZ
- Related: ASL RS01; Tommykaira ZZ

Powertrain
- Engine: 2.7 L (2700 cc) RB26DETT twin-turbocharged I6
- Transmission: 6-speed manual

Dimensions
- Length: 4,300 mm (169 in)
- Width: 1,860 mm (73 in)
- Height: 1,190 mm (47 in)
- Curb weight: 1,000 kg (2,205 lb)

Chronology
- Predecessor: Tommykaira ZZ (first gen.)

The Tommykaira ZZII is a Japanese mid-engined sports car engineered and developed by Tommykaira in 2001. Designed by Noriyuki Nishida, built on the desire to race in the 24 Hours of Le Mans the ZZII was intended to be the bigger and faster version of the ZZ, but it failed to enter production and remained in the prototype stage due to a lack of funding.

Vehicle retailer Autobacs Seven bought the design shortly after it was shown and tried to market the car as the ASL RS01.

== Specifications and design ==
The car is powered by a modified 2.7-liter twin-turbocharged RB26DETT I6 engine sourced from Nissan delivering 542 hp (404 kW; 550 PS) at 5,900 rpm. The engine's displacement was increased from its original 2.6 L (2568 cc) to 2.7 L (2700 cc), (Note: This displacement increase kit is sometimes unofficially referred to as the 'RB27DETT'.) as well as other modifications to increase power including forged aluminum pistons with titanium-coated rings, new connecting rods with inverted H section, lightened and balanced crankshaft, racing ignition, polished valve seats, metal head gasket, re-profiled cams with higher lift and improved timing, reinforced valve springs, new ECU, improved intercooler with Skyline N1 water pump, new Garrett turbochargers, more powerful injectors and fuel pump, and a 3.5" catback Fujitsubo exhaust with Tommykaira exhaust tips.

The car was intended to weigh 1,000 kg (2,205 lb), mostly thanks to its ZZ-derived aluminium chassis and full carbon fiber bodywork. The frame is of the same type of the ZZ—square section extruded aluminium tub, with steel subframes—but the tub was shaped as an oval instead of an arrow, by curving the walls, so the seats didn't have to be pointed inwards. The subframes were designed as crumple zones too, so that the car could be crash homologated. The design is aerodynamic and intended for lower drag coefficients and better airflow. The two distinctive roof dynamic air intakes come to shape a large NACA duct on the rear window, intended to collect more air into the intercooler. The power is delivered to all four wheels by a 6-speed Getrag manual transmission derived from the fifth generation (R34) Skyline GT-R together with the ATTESA ET-S Pro system, also making the car all-wheel drive. A custom transfer case had to be designed to allow for different diameter wheels front to rear. Autobacs estimated it to weigh 1,200 kg (2,646 lb), due to the all-wheel drive system and to the bodywork of the prototype being made of fiberglass rather than carbon fiber. Engineering challenges during development meant that the prototype's front driveshaft was left unconnected, leaving it rear-wheel drive.

The ZZII is capable of doing 0–100 km/h (0–62 mph) in 3.1 seconds (less than 3 s according to some sources), despatching the quarter mile in 10.8 seconds at 208 km/h (129 mph) and a claimed top speed of 338 km/h (210 mph).

== Fate and potential revival ==
After its unveiling at the 2002 Tokyo Auto Salon, Tommykaira promised to sell the car in high volumes, with the company already having an organized delivery schedule after the show. Shortly after its unveiling, however, the design was bought out by Autobacs Seven, and later renamed the car to ASL RS01. It also remained in prototype condition, which meant the car did not go into production.

In early 2022, Tomita announced he was working on setting a limited production run of ZZIIs, but little further information has been disclosed. To promote the car and the revived brand, the ZZII will be placed in a showroom in Kyoto. The Tommykaira Salon features the prototype on permanent display as well as a ZZII racing simulator and the sale of apparel.

In 2025, an interview was conducted on YouTube with Tomita-san showcasing the original prototype.

== In popular media ==
The ZZII was a regular addition to the Gran Turismo video game series since Gran Turismo 2. It last appeared in Gran Turismo 6.

In Gran Turismo 2, the car's design is completely distinct from the final prototype version since the car was featured when it still was in its first concept iteration, with RWD and 600 PS (440 kW; 590 hp). This car has a more serious look and has an appearance that is similar to that of a GT1 race car, as it was intended to be a true road going racecar. Soon afterwards, the concept was turned into a GT-style car with AWD and a more gentle power delivery. The car featured in Gran Turismo 3: A-Spec and later games is based on this concept design; the polygonal model was not updated after the car's design was finished.

The definitive design of the car was featured in the game GT Pro Series, as the ASL RS01.
