= Leading Edge Sports Car Company =

British car company

- Industry: Automotive
- Founded: June 2002
- Defunct: September 2005
- Fate: Dissolved
- Headquarters: Dereham, Norfolk, United Kingdom
- Products: Automobiles

Leading Edge Sports Car Company was a British car company based in Dereham, Norfolk established in June 2002. The company was dissolved in September 2005. It outsourced the manufacture of its cars to fellow Dereham company Breckland Technologies.

== Leading Edge 190 RT ==
Leading Edge was established in 2002 by Paul Mickleburgh to market its first new car, the 190 and 240 RT in Europe and the US. The car was a lightly updated version of the Tommykaira ZZ, a popular car in Japan, but made in Norfolk, and it suffered from the Japanese recession and the company became bankrupt. The receivers sold the tooling and inventory to neighbouring Breckland Technology Ltd, run by ex-Lotus engineer Mark Easton, who continued to manufacture the cars and sold them on to Leading Edge to distribute from the summer of July 2002 at a price of around £26,500.

The car featured a mid-mounted Nissan 2.0 L twin cam engine (1998cc), producing 180 bhp (134 kW; 182 PS) at 6900 rpm and torque of 142 lb⋅ft (193 N⋅m) at 4900 rpm. Top speed was claimed to reach 140 mph (230 km/h) and accelerate 0-60 mph in 4.8 seconds. Its open-top body was glassfibre, with an extruded aluminium central tub topped and tailed by tubular metal subframes and weighed only 763 kg (1,682 lb).

== Leading Edge 240 RT ==
The 240 RT was also launched in 2002 as a high-powered version of the previous Tommykaira ZZ. The 240 shared the same Nissan 2.0 L engined as the 190 RT, but with a higher output of 240 bhp (179 kW; 243 PS), producing an acceleration time of 4.4 seconds to 60 mph. With the addition of a hard top roof in 2004, the weight increased to 809 kg.
