= Breckland Beira =

Overview
- Manufacturer: Breckland Technologies
- Production: 2008
- Assembly: Dereham, Norfolk

Body and chassis
- Class: Sports car
- Body style: Roadster
- Layout: FR layout
- Related: Pontiac Solstice; Saturn Sky; Opel GT

Powertrain
- Engine: 6.0 L V8 GM LS2

Dimensions
- Curb weight: 1,400 kg (3,086 lb)

The Breckland Beira is a sports car launched in June 2008 at the London Motorexpo, developed by the British company Breckland Technologies based in Dereham, Norfolk. Breckland Technologies was founded in 2000 specialising in manufacturing low volume specialist sports cars such as the Leading Edge 240 RT and Mosler MT900. The company became insolvent soon after the announcement of the new Beira, and was dissolved in July 2009.

== Beira V8 ==
Based on the GM Kappa platform, the Breckland Biera was closely related to the Pontiac Solstice, Saturn Sky and Opel GT. Featuring the 6.0 L V8 LS2 engine from General Motors producing around 400 bhp, and mated to a Tremec six-speed manual gearbox, the Beira was developed to work with LPG to give it a dual fuel range of around 700 miles. Around 25 cm was added to the length of the car to accommodate a 70-litre LPG tank alongside the regular petrol tank.

Official performance figures were not formally issued, the 1400 kg car was expected to accelerate 0-62 mph in under 5 seconds.

It was anticipated that the first cars would be on sale from November 2008 at around £55,000 but only in left hand drive. According to Breckland Technologies director Mike Rawlings, ‘the Beira carries on from where Marcos and TVR left off’.

Beyond the initial launch cars, production never started though a facelift version was photographed by a German car magazine in November 2008. The company folded in July 2009 without any known deliveries.
